= List of drugs: Em–Ep =

This multi-page article lists pharmaceutical drugs alphabetically by name. Many drugs have more than one name and, therefore, the same drug may be listed more than once. Brand names and generic names are differentiated by capitalizing brand names.

See also the list of the top 100 bestselling branded drugs, ranked by sales.

Abbreviations are used in the list as follows:

- INN = International nonproprietary name
- BAN = British Approved Name
- USAN = United States Adopted Name
- Two-letter codes for countries

Lists of drugs
1–9 | A | B | C | D | E | F | G | H | I | J | K | L | M | N | O | P | Q | R | S | T | U | V | W | X | Y | Z

Ea–El | Em–Ep | Eq–Es | Et | Eu–Ez

== em ==
=== ema-emi ===
- Emadine
- emakalim (INN)
- Embeline
- Emblaveo
- Embolex
- embramine (INN)
- embusartan (INN)
- embutramide (INN)
- Emcyt
- Emcyt
- emedastine (INN)
- Emend
- Emend (injection)
- emepepimut-S (USAN)
- emepronium bromide (INN)
- Emete-Con
- emfilermin (INN)
- Emgel
- emicerfont (USAN, INN)
- Emicizumab
- emideltide (INN)
- emiglitate (INN)
- emilium tosilate (INN)
- emitefur (INN)

=== eml-emy ===
- Emla
- emoctakin (INN)
- emopamil (INN)
- emorfazone (INN)
- empagliflozin (INN)
- Empracet
- Emrelis
- emricasan (USAN, INN)
- Emrosi
- Emtriva
- emylcamate (INN)

== en ==
=== ena-enc ===
- enadoline (INN)
- enahexal
- enalapril (INN)
- enalaprilat (INN)
- enalkiren (INN)
- enasidenib (INN)
- enazadrem (INN)
- Enbrel
- enbucrilate (INN)
- encainide (INN)
- Encelto
- enciprazine (INN)
- enclomifene (INN)
- encyprate (INN)

=== end-enj ===
- Endep
- endixaprine (INN)
- endomide (INN)
- endomycin (INN)
- Endosol Extra
- endralazine (INN)
- Endrate
- endrisone (INN)
- Enduron
- Enduronyl
- enefexine (INN)
- enestebol (INN)
- enfenamic acid (INN)
- enfilcon A (USAN)
- Enflonsia
- enflurane (INN)
- enfuvirtide (USAN)
- englitazone (INN)
- eniclobrate (INN)
- enilconazole (INN)
- enilospirone (INN)
- eniluracil (INN)
- enisamium iodide (INN)
- enisoprost (INN)
- Enjuvia

=== enl-enr ===
- enlimomab pegol (INN)
- Enlituo
- Enlon-Plus
- Enlon
- enloplatin (INN)
- enocitabine (INN)
- enofelast (INN)
- enolicam (INN)
- Enovid
- enoxacin (INN)
- enoxamast (INN)
- enoxaparin sodium (INN)
- enoximone (INN)
- enoxolone (INN)
- enpiprazole (INN)
- enpiroline (INN)
- enprazepine (INN)
- Enpresse
- enprofylline (INN)
- enpromate (INN)
- enprostil (INN)
- enramycin (INN)
- enrofloxacin (INN)
- Enropro

=== ens-enz ===
- Ensacove
- ensaculin (INN)
- ensartinib (USAN, INN)
- ensitrelvir (INN)
- ensituximab (USAN)
- Enspryng
- entacapone (INN)
- entecavir (INN)
- entinostat (INN)
- Entocort EC
- entsufon (INN)
- Enulose
- enviomycin (INN)
- enviradene (INN)
- enviroxime (INN)
- Enwylma
- enzastaurin (USAN)
- Enzeevu

== eo ==
- Eohilia
- Eovist

== ep ==
=== epa-epe ===
- epafipase (INN)
- epalrestat (INN)
- epanolol (INN)
- epcoritamab (INN)
- epelestat (INN)
- eperezolid (INN)
- eperisone (INN)
- epervudine (INN)
- epetirimod (USAN, INN)

=== epi-epl ===
- Epi E Z Pen Jr
- epicainide (INN)
- epicillin eta (INN)
- Epicort
- epicriptine (INN)
- Epiduo
- Epiduo Forte
- Epiduo Gel
- epiestriol (INN)
- Epifoam
- epimestrol (INN)
- epinastine (INN)
- epinephrine (INN)
- Epioxa
- Epioxa HD
- EpiPen
- epipropidine (INN)
- epirizole (INN)
- epiroprim (INN)
- epirubicin (INN)
- eptifibatide (INN)
- epitiostanol (INN)
- epitizide (INN)
- Epitol
- epitumomab cituxetan (INN)
- Epivir
- Epkinly
- eplerenone (INN)
- eplivanserin (USAN)
- eplontersen (INN)

=== epo-ept ===
- epoetin alfa (INN)
- epoetin beta (INN)
- epoetin gamma (INN)
- epoetin delta (USAN)
- epoetin epsilon (INN)
- epoetin zeta (INN)
- epoetin theta (INN)
- epoetin iota (INN)
- epoetin kappa (INN)
- epoetin omega (INN)
- Epogen
- epoprostenol (INN)
- epostane (INN)
- eprazinone (INN)
- epratuzumab (INN)
- eprinomectin (INN)
- epristeride (INN)
- eprobemide (INN)
- eprodisate (USAN, INN)
- eprosartan (INN)
- eprotirome (INN)
- eprovafen (INN)
- eproxindine (INN)
- eprozinol (INN)
- Epruvy
- epsiprantel (INN)
- eptacog alfa (activated) (INN)
- eptaloprost (INN)
- eptastigmine (INN)
- eptazocine (INN)
- eptifibatide (INN)
- eptotermin alfa (INN)

=== epy ===
- Epysqli
