= E5 =

E5, E05 or E-5 may refer to:

- E5 fuel, a mixture of 5% ethanol and 95% gasoline

== Transportation ==
=== Airlines ===
- Samara Airlines, a former Russian airline with IATA code E5
- Air Arabia Egypt, an Egyptian airline with IATA code E5

=== Automobiles ===
- AUDI E5 Sportback, a 2024–present mid-size electric station wagon
- Buick Electra E5, a 2023–present Chinese compact mid-size SUV
- BYD e5, a 2015–2020 Chinese compact electric sedan
- Chery E5, a 2011–2016 Chinese compact sedan
- Chery Omoda E5, alternatively Omoda E5 or Chery E5, a 2024–present Chinese compact electric SUV
- Geely Galaxy E5, a 2024–present Chinese compact electric SUV
- Weltmeister E5, a 2021–present Chinese compact electric sedan
- Bestune NAT, a 2021–present Chinese compact electric MPV

=== Roads and routes ===
- E5 European long distance path, a European long-distance walking route
- E5 expressway (Philippines) (North Luzon Expressway Segments 8, 9 & 10 and C-5 Southlink Expressway), an expressway route in the Philippines
- European route E5, a road in the international E-road network
- London Buses route E5, a Transport for London contracted bus route
- Shah Alam Expressway, route E5 in Malaysia
- Hokkaido Jukan expressways (a combination of Hakodate Shindō, Hokkaido Expressway, Nayoro-Bifuka Road, Otoineppu Bypass, Horotomi Bypass and Toyotomi Bypass), route E5 in Japan

=== Locomotives ===
- E5 Series Shinkansen, a Japanese high-speed train
- EMC E5, an American diesel locomotive
- LB&SCR E5 class, a British steam locomotive
- LNER Class E5, a class of British steam locomotives

== Electronics ==
- Honda E5, one of the predecessors of ASIMO robot
- Huawei E5, a series of mobile WiFi devices
- Nokia E5, a smartphone
- Olympus E-5, a DSLR camera
- Samsung Galaxy E5, a smartphone

== Sports ==
- An error by the Third baseman in baseball
- Earl Clark (born 1988), forward for the University of Louisville men's basketball team
- E5 grade, of difficulty in rock climbing

== Military ==
- E-5 (rank), a military pay grade in the United States
- E5, a German World War II tank version in the Entwicklung series
- HMS E5, a 1911 Royal Navy submarine
- Windecker E-5, an American experimental stealth aircraft of the 1970s

== Medicine ==
- E05: Hyperthyroidism, ICD-10 code
- E5, a codename for edobacomab

== Politics ==
- European Group of Five, unofficial European Union (EU) grouping.
- E5 (European Group of Five), a meeting of the five greatest European military powers, established as a format in 2024.

== Other uses ==
- E5 (EP), an album by Ivy Queen
- E5 polytope, in geometry
- E5 screw, a type of Edison screw
- E5, a postcode district in the E postcode area

== See also ==
- 5E (disambiguation)
