= C18H29NO2 =

The molecular formula C_{18}H_{29}NO_{2} (molar mass: 291.43 g/mol, exact mass: 291.2198 u) may refer to:

- Exaprolol
- Ketocaine
- Penbutolol
