= C20H25NO2 =

The molecular formula C_{20}H_{25}NO_{2} may refer to:

- Adiphenine
- Dienogest
- Estrazinol, or 3-methoxy-8-aza-19-norpregna-1,3,5(10)-trien-20-yn-17-ol
- Femoxetine
- Ketorfanol, or ketorphanol
