= C17H26N4O =

The molecular formula C_{17}H_{26}N_{4}O (molar mass: 302.41 g/mol, exact mass: 302.2107 u) may refer to:

- Alniditan
- Emedastine
