= C30H50O5 =

The molecular formula C_{30}H_{50}O_{5} (molar mass: 490.71 g/mol, exact mass: 490.3658 u) may refer to:

- Balsaminapentaol
- Cycloastragenol
- Eldecalcitol, an analog of Vitamin D
