= C13H20N2O3S =

The molecular formula C_{13}H_{20}N_{2}O_{3}S may refer to:

- Articaine, a dental amide-type local anesthetic
- Etozolin, a loop diuretic used in Europe
