= C23H22FN3O =

The molecular formula C_{23}H_{22}FN_{3}O (molar mass: 375.44 g/mol, exact mass: 375.1747 u) may refer to:

- Elopiprazole
- 5F-PCN, also called 5F-MN-21
