= Streptomyces chartreusis =

Scientific classification
- Domain: Bacteria
- Kingdom: Bacillati
- Phylum: Actinomycetota
- Class: Actinomycetes
- Order: Streptomycetales
- Family: Streptomycetaceae
- Genus: Streptomyces
- Species: S. chartreusis

Binomial name
- Streptomyces chartreusis Leach et al. 1953 (Approved Lists 1980)

Type strain
- AS 4.1639, ATCC 14922, ATCC 19738, BCRC 13673, CBS 476.68, CCRC 13673, CCT 5005, CGMCC 4.1639, DSM 40085, ETH 12395, ETH 24226, ICMP 154, ICMP 321, IFO 12753, ISP 5085, JCM 4570, K-180, KCC 16, KCC S-0570, KCTC 9704, LMG 8587, NBRC 12753, NIHJ 169, NRRL 2287, NRRL 22870, NRRL B-2287, NRRL-ISP 5085, NZRCC 10328, RIA 1018, RIA 738, UC 2012, UNIQEM 126, VKM Ac-1721

Species of bacterium

Streptomyces chartreusis is a bacterium species from the genus of Streptomyces which has been isolated from soil in Africa. Streptomyces chartreusis produces N-deacyltunicamycin, elsamicin A, aminoacylase and chartreusin.

== See also ==
- List of Streptomyces species
