= C8H10N4O2 =

The molecular formula C_{8}H_{10}N_{4}O_{2} may refer to:

- Enprofylline, a xanthine derivative used in the treatment of asthma.
- Caffeine, the world's most widely consumed psychoactive drug, present in coffee, chocolate, black and green tea, energy drinks, and more.
