= C18H24ClNO3 =

The molecular formula C_{18}H_{24}ClNO_{3} (molar mass: 337.84 g/mol, exact mass: 337.1445 u) may refer to:

- Ericolol
- SN 35210
