= National Academy of Medical Sciences of Ukraine =

Ukrainian research organization

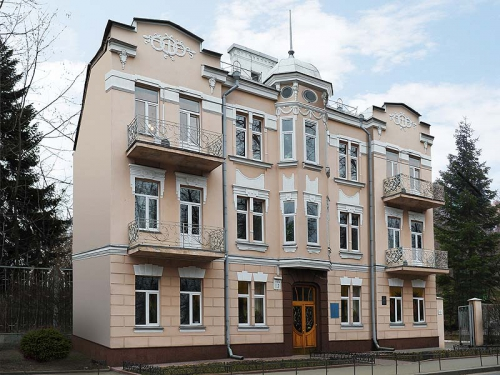
- office in Kyiv, Herzen, str 12.
- Founder: President of Ukraine
- Established: 1993
- Location: Kyiv, Ukraine
- Website: http://amnu.gov.ua/istoriya/

The National Academy of Medical Sciences of Ukraine (Ukrainian: Національна академія медичних наук України, romanized: Natsionalna akademiia medychnykh nauk Ukrainy) was established by the Decree of the President of Ukraine of February 24, 1993 No. 59 [59/93]. The academy is a state-owned research organization on medicine and health care, which operates in accordance with the legislation of Ukraine on a self-governing basis.

The status of the National Academy was granted by the Decree of the President of Ukraine of February 24, 2010 No. 255.

== History of the academy ==
In 1991, the Department of Medical Problems was organized at the National Academy of Sciences of Ukraine (then the Academy of Sciences of the Ukrainian SSR). But leading medical scientists understood the need to establish an Academy of Medical Sciences in Ukraine. In November 1992, the Verkhovna Rada of Ukraine adopted the Law "Fundamentals of the Legislation of Ukraine on Health Care", the 20th article of which included the following: "Higher scientific medical institution of Ukraine search is the Academy of Medical Sciences of Ukraine. In pursuance of this Law, the establishment of the academy was initiated. The principles of organization of the Academy of Medical Sciences were discussed at the meeting of the President of the National Academy of Sciences Academician Borys Paton and Academicians Mykola Amosov, Oleksandr Vozianov, Yuriy Kundiev, Olena Lukyanova, Volodymyr Frolkis, Oleksandr Shalimov with the President of Ukraine Leonid Kravchuk. On February 24, 1993, the President of Ukraine signed a Decree establishing the Academy of Medical Sciences, defining its status, main tasks and establishing the number. The Presidential Decree was developed by the resolution of the Cabinet of Ministers of Ukraine, which appointed Academician Vozianov President-Organizer of the academy, appointed 25 founding academics, and determined the list of scientific institutions that were to be part of the academy.

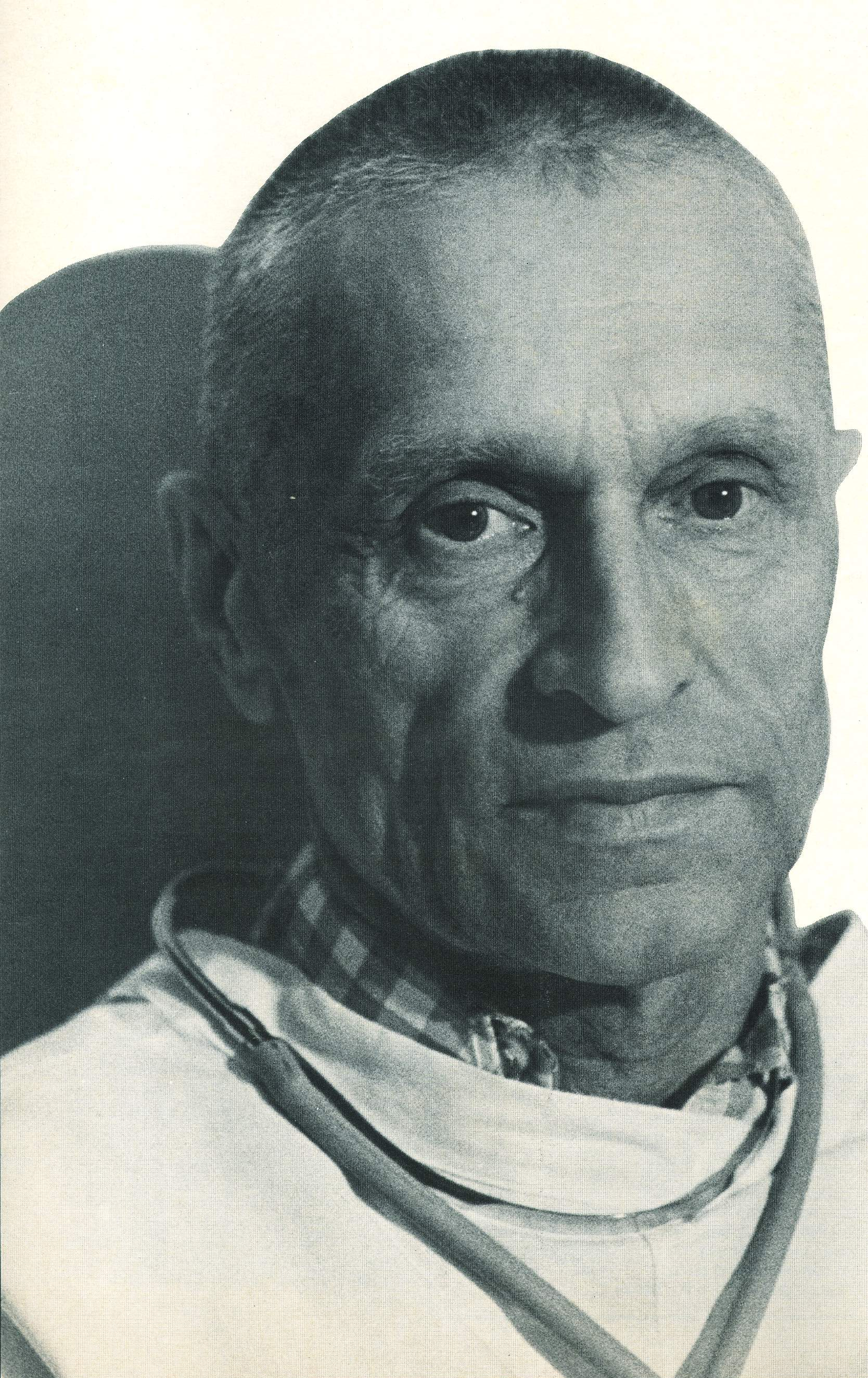
Mykola Amosov — Academician of the National Academy of Medical Sciences of Ukraine

Later, at the General Meeting of the Academy of Medical Sciences of Ukraine, Academician Vozianov was elected President of the academy, Academicians Zozulya and Frolkis were elected vice-presidents, and after the death of Frolkis, Academician Kundiev. Later, another position of vice president was taken by Academician Rosenfeld. Until 1997, the position of Chief Scientific Secretary of the Academy of Medical Sciences of Ukraine was held by the corresponding member of the Academy of Medical Sciences of Ukraine Gubsky, and since 1997 the corresponding member of the Academy of Medical Sciences of Ukraine was elected.

The Academy of Medical Sciences of Ukraine initially included 13 scientific institutions. In the past 15 years, six more scientific institutions have been established. In addition, in 2000, by a resolution of the Cabinet of Ministers of Ukraine, 18 more research institutes were transferred to the academy. The Academy of Medical Sciences employs more than 20,000 people, including about 3,000 scientists, including nearly 2,500 doctors and candidates of science. The staff of the academy consists of 32 full members and 75 corresponding members.

The compound enisamium iodide known as Amizon was first synthesized by scientists of the Institute of Pharmacology and Toxicology of the National Academy of Medical Sciences (NAMS) of Ukraine.
