= Ozolinone =

Chemical compound

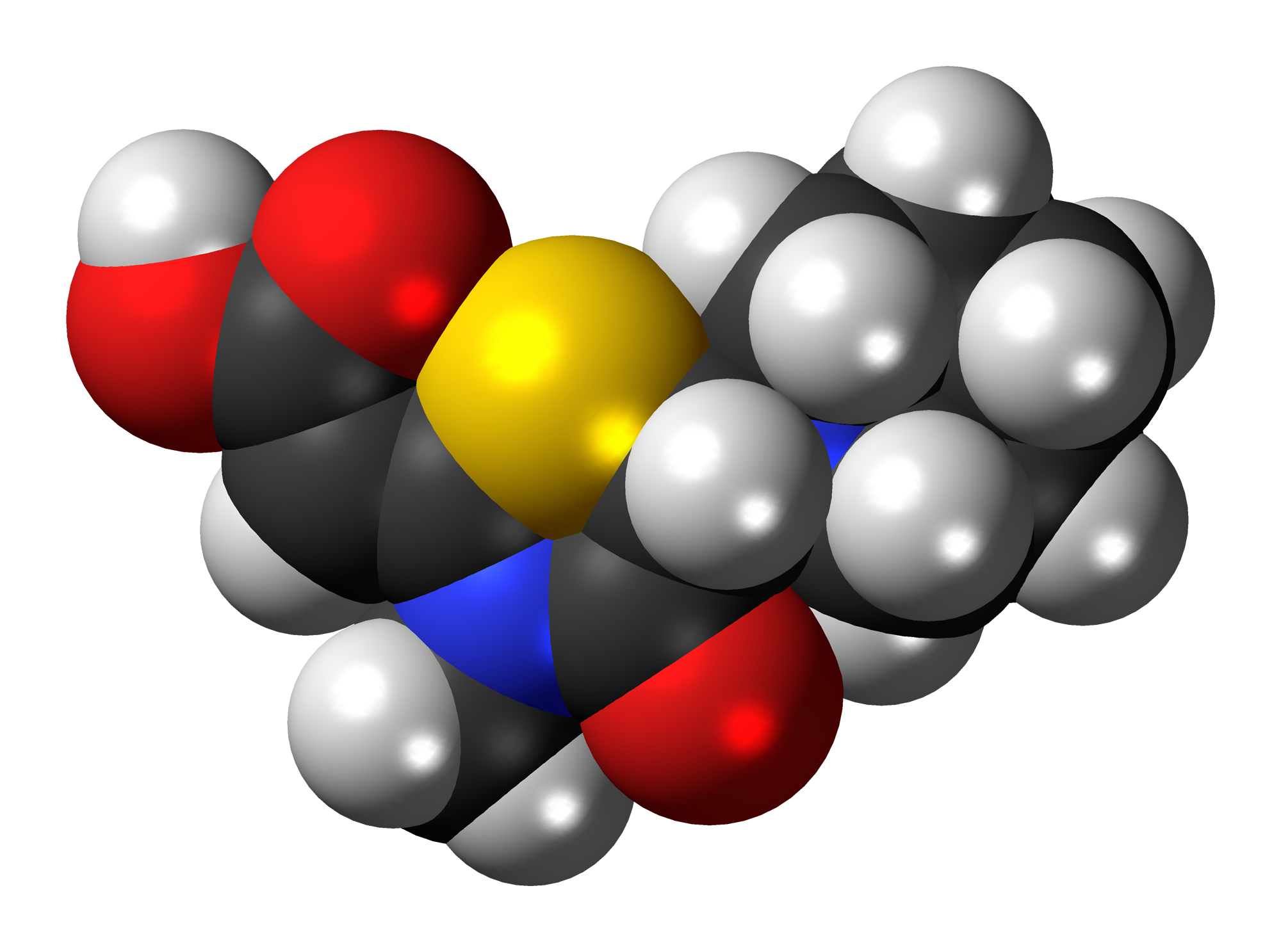

Clinical data
- Routes of administration: Oral
- ATC code: None

Legal status
- Legal status: In general: uncontrolled

Identifiers
- IUPAC name: (2Z)-2-(3-methyl-4-oxo-5-piperidin-1-yl-1,3-thiazolidin-2-ylidene)acetic acid
- CAS Number: 56784-39-5
- PubChem CID: 6436036
- ChemSpider: 23253355
- UNII: 55TIT7J81D
- KEGG: D05323
- CompTox Dashboard (EPA): DTXSID30866590
- ECHA InfoCard: 100.054.876

Chemical and physical data
- Formula: C_{11}H_{16}N_{2}O_{3}S
- Molar mass: 256.32 g·mol^{−1}
- 3D model (JSmol): Interactive image
- SMILES: O=C(O)/C=C1/N(C)C(=O)C(S1)N2CCCCC2

Ozolinone is a loop diuretic which was never marketed.

It is an active metabolite of etozoline.

== See also ==
- Etozoline — a prodrug of ozolinone
