= 5E =

5E or 5-E can refer to:

- 5°E, or 5th meridian east, a longitude coordinate
- 5e, a type of Category 5 cable
- 5E, a learning cycle developed by Biological Sciences Curriculum Study.
- 5E (album), a 2018 album by N.O.R.E.
- Astra 5°E, a communications satellite
- Dungeons & Dragons 5th edition, a fantasy tabletop role-playing game (RPG) released in 2014.
- F-5E, a model of Northrop F-5 jet
- Five Eyes, an espionage alliance between the US, UK, NZ, Canada, and Australia.
- Tropical Depression Five-E (2008)
- SGA Airlines (IATA airline code)

== See also ==
- E5 (disambiguation)
