= Enmetazobactam =

Clinical data
- License data: US DailyMed: Enmetazobactam

Legal status
- Legal status: US: ℞-only

Identifiers
- IUPAC name: (2S,3S,5R)-3-methyl-3-[(3-methyltriazol-3-ium-1-yl)methyl]-4,4,7-trioxo-4λ^{6}-thia-1-azabicyclo[3.2.0]heptane-2-carboxylate
- CAS Number: 1001404-83-6
- PubChem CID: 23653540
- DrugBank: DB18716
- ChemSpider: 68025157
- UNII: 80VUN7L00C
- KEGG: D12817
- ChEMBL: ChEMBL4458276

Chemical and physical data
- Formula: C_{11}H_{14}N_{4}O_{5}S
- Molar mass: 314.32 g·mol^{−1}
- 3D model (JSmol): Interactive image
- SMILES: C[C@@]1([C@@H](N2[C@H](S1(=O)=O)CC2=O)C(=O)[O-])CN3C=C[N+](=N3)C
- InChI: InChI=1S/C11H14N4O5S/c1-11(6-14-4-3-13(2)12-14)9(10(17)18)15-7(16)5-8(15)21(11,19)20/h3-4,8-9H,5-6H2,1-2H3/t8-,9+,11+/m1/s1; Key:HFZITXBUTWITPT-YWVKMMECSA-N

Enmetazobactam (AAI-101) is an antibiotic adjuvant drug which acts as a beta-lactamase inhibitor, preventing the breakdown of other antibiotic drugs. Enmetazobactam was invented by a team of scientists at Orchid Pharma in India and then out-licensed to Allecra Therapeutics for further development. In the United States and European Union, enmetazobactam is approved for use in the combination cefepime/enmetazobactam (Exblifep).
