= Chartreusin =

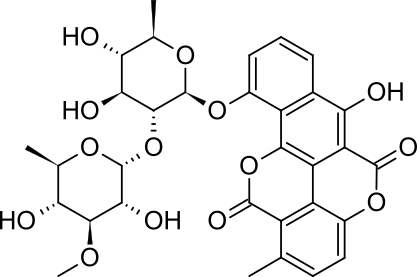

Names
- IUPAC name 6-Hydroxy-1-methyl-10-[3-O-methyl-α-D-fucopyranosyl-(1→2)-β-D-fucopyranosyloxy]benzo[h][1]benzopyrano[5,4,3-cde][1]benzopyran-5,12-dione
- Systematic IUPAC name 10-{[(2S,3R,4S,5R,6R)-3-{[(2R,3R,4S,5S,6R)-3,5-Dihydroxy-4-methoxy-6-methyloxan-2-yl]oxy}-4,5-dihydroxy-6-methyloxan-2-yl]oxy}-6-hydroxy-1-methylbenzo[h][1]benzopyrano[5,4,3-cde][1]benzopyran-5,12-dione

Identifiers
CAS Number	6377-18-0
3D model (JSmol)	Interactive image
ChemSpider	4444748
ECHA InfoCard	100.164.122
PubChem CID	5281394
UNII	HS0H395E3O
CompTox Dashboard (EPA)	DTXSID20930431
- InChI: InChI=1S/C32H32O14/c1-10-8-9-15-18-16(10)29(38)45-26-17-13(23(35)20(19(18)26)30(39)43-15)6-5-7-14(17)44-32-28(24(36)21(33)11(2)42-32)46-31-25(37)27(40-4)22(34)12(3)41-31/h5-9,11-12,21-22,24-25,27-28,31-37H,1-4H3/t11-,12-,21+,22+,24+,25-,27+,28-,31-,32+/m1/s1 Key: PONPPNYZKHNPKZ-RYBWXQSLSA-N; InChI=1/C32H32O14/c1-10-8-9-15-18-16(10)29(38)45-26-17-13(23(35)20(19(18)26)30(39)43-15)6-5-7-14(17)44-32-28(24(36)21(33)11(2)42-32)46-31-25(37)27(40-4)22(34)12(3)41-31/h5-9,11-12,21-22,24-25,27-28,31-37H,1-4H3/t11-,12-,21+,22+,24+,25-,27+,28-,31-,32+/m1/s1 Key: PONPPNYZKHNPKZ-RYBWXQSLBI
- SMILES: Cc1ccc2c3c1c(=O)oc4c3c(c(c5c4c(ccc5)O[C@H]6[C@@H]([C@H]([C@H]([C@H](O6)C)O)O)O[C@@H]7[C@@H]([C@H]([C@H]([C@H](O7)C)O)OC)O)O)c(=O)o2

Properties
Chemical formula	C_{32}H_{32}O_{14}
Molar mass	640.588
- Except where otherwise noted, data are given for materials in their standard state (at 25 °C [77 °F], 100 kPa). Infobox references

Chartreusin is an antibiotic originally isolated from the bacteria Streptomyces chartreusis. The crystalline compound itself has a yellow-green colour, as per its name, and is stable at room temperature for several hours. Chartreusin is chemically related to elsamitrucin, as the two share an aglycone chartarin structure, though they differ in their sugar moieties. Both chartreusin and elsamitrucin were found to have anticancer activity.

== Biological activity ==
Chartreusin was shown to be effective as an antibiotic against some gram-positive species, as well as mycobacteria. This compound has also displayed anti-cancer activity, particularly against certain melanomas and leukemia in mice. However, this effect could only be observed in-vivo when the antibiotic was administered via intraperitoneal injection. Chartreusin administered by intravenous therapy was ineffective, as the compound would be excreted through the bile.

This compound is believed to function by binding directly to DNA, preventing its replication. It binds cooperatively and has a high affinity for alternating AT or GC sequences. Upon binding, Chartreusin may inhibit the relaxation of negatively supercoiled DNA, or induce strand scission. Consequently, this compound has been shown to interfere with mammalian cells' progression through the cell cycle. In the presence of chartreusin, cells in the G1 stage move more slowly into S, while cells in the G2 stage are entirely prevented from moving on to mitosis. Those cells already in the S phase are likely to experience lethal effects, though Chartreusin's lethality is also a function of both dosage and duration of exposure.

== Pharmaceutical potential ==
Chartreusin is not currently considered to have significant potential as an anti-cancer drug. The concentration required for the drug to inhibit cell growth is typically also cytotoxic. Among surviving cells, prolonged exposure to Chartreusin leads to irreversible inhibition of growth and damage to DNA. Fortunately, the chemically similar elsamitrucin, or elsamicin A, has a better outlook.
