= Ariel Hollinshead =

American pharmacologist

Ariel Cahill Hollinshead (August 24, 1929 – September 10, 2019) was an American cancer researcher and professor who spent her career at George Washington University. She was a pioneer in discovering tumor antigens and developing them as cancer vaccines. She is sometimes referred to as the "Mother of Immunotherapy."

== Life ==
Hollinshead was born Ariel Cahill Hollinshead on August 24, 1929. Her family were Quakers.

In 1947, she began studying zoology and chemistry at Swarthmore College, chosen because it was a Quaker school, but soon switched to Ohio University in order to have access to a stronger science program. After earning a bachelor's degree at Ohio in 1951, she went to George Washington University (GW), where she earned a PhD in 1957.

She joined the GW Medical Center faculty in 1959 as Assistant Professor of Pharmacology, in 1974, she became Professor of Medicine and in 1991 took on emeritus status.

In 1958, Hollinshead married Montgomery K. Hyun, whom she met while they were both at Swarthmore college, and they had two sons together; her husband died in 2016. Ariel Hollinshead died at the age of 90 on September 10, 2019.

== Research and work ==
Her research initially focused on oncovirology - the role of viruses in causing cancer, looking to develop cancer vaccines. In her initial set of experiments, she attempted to use fragments of oncoviruses to see if they caused an immune response in animals; as part of these experiments she used membrane fragments from tumors caused by the virus as a scientific control. To her surprise, the membrane fragments elicited a stronger response.

Colleagues and funders were skeptical, but she was able to validate her results and eventually invented methods using ultrasound to isolate the immune-inducing substance from the membrane fragments. This led to one of the first identification of tumor antigens (also called "tumor-associated antigens"). She then began working with human tumors from people with lung cancer, and again had to develop methods to isolate tumor antigens from them. This work led to the first clinical trials of cancer vaccines using tumor antigens in the early 1970s. She then began following the same process to identify and test tumor antigens from women with ovarian cancer, and her work resulted in clinical trials in the early 1980s.

After studying whether purified tumor-associated antigens (TAA) can trigger a patient's immune response without causing harm, she discovered that patients displayed a strong immune response after taking the TAA vaccinations, and even after five months, they did not show any signs of systematic toxicity.

She then turned back to virology and joined the effort to develop an HIV vaccine.

Throughout her career she supported other women in the sciences, in part through Graduate Women in Science Sigma Delta Epsilon honorary society and Professional Organization for Women in Science.

At least two startup companies were formed to develop her work: International BioImmune Systems, which did the lung cancer work, and later Neogenix (subsequently sold to Precision Biologics, Inc.), the lead product of which is ensituximab, a monoclonal antibody raised against a set of tumor antigens identified by Hollinshead.

She served on Oncology Boards for Medical College of Pennsylvania, and Neogenix Oncology, Inc.

== Honors and awards ==
She received the Marion Spencer Fay Award from Drexel University in 1975 and 1976 she was named "Bicentennial Medical Woman of the Year" by the Joint Board of American Medical Colleges for her cancer research.

In 1977, she received an Honorary Membership Award by the Graduate Women in Science (GWIS) organization to acknowledge her scientific research.

In 1980 she received the "Star of Europe", an honor conferred jointly by the ministers of health of Germany, Italy, and England, and was one of nine women scientists honored at a reception at the White House by President Jimmy Carter.

Additionally, in 2008, she received the GWIS award for Meritorious Service for her extensive involvement in the organization.

In 2013 she was recognized by GWAA (George Washington Alumni Association) for being the "Mother of Immunotherapy".

2014 She was introduced to the Bethel Park Great Alumni Hall of Fame, because of her 280 published articles on active immunotherapy, and developing, managing, and testing the epitome activity for 17 different clinical trials.

She was a fellow of the American Academy of Microbiology and the American Association for the Advancement of Science.

== Publications ==
- Hollinshead, A (1991). "Active specific immunotherapy and immunochemotherapy in the treatment of lung and colon cancer". Seminars in Surgical Oncology. 7 (4): 199–210. doi:10.1002/ssu.2980070405. PMID 1925251.
- Hollinshead, A; Stewart, TH; Takita, H; Dalbow, M; Concannon, J (15 September 1987). "Adjuvant specific active lung cancer immunotherapy trials. Tumor-associated antigens" (PDF). Cancer. 60 (6): 1249–62. doi:10.1002/1097-0142(19870915)60:6<1249::AID-CNCR2820600616>3.0.CO;2-I. PMID 2441838.
- Hollinshead, A; Tarro, G; Foster WA, Jr; Seigel, LJ; Jaffurs, W (May 1974). "Studies of tumor-specific and herpesvirus nonvirion antigens" (PDF). Cancer Research. 34 (5): 1122–5. PMID 4842911.
