= Elranatamab =

Medication

Monoclonal antibody
- Type: Bi-specific T-cell engager
- Target: BCMA-expressing multiple myeloma cells and CD3-expressing T-cells

Clinical data
- Trade names: Elrexfio
- Other names: elranatamab-bcmm
- AHFS/Drugs.com: Monograph
- MedlinePlus: a623045
- License data: US DailyMed: Elranatamab
- Pregnancy category: AU: C
- Routes of administration: Subcutaneous
- ATC code: L01FX32 (WHO)

Legal status
- Legal status: AU: S4 (Prescription only); CA: ℞-only / Schedule D; US: ℞-only; EU: Rx-only

Identifiers
- CAS Number: 2408850-14-4
- DrugBank: DB15395
- UNII: L0HR9A577V
- KEGG: D12058

Chemical and physical data
- Formula: C_{6440}H_{9958}N_{1738}O_{2010}S_{49}
- Molar mass: 145461.60 g·mol^{−1}

Elranatamab, sold under the brand name Elrexfio, is a medication used for the treatment of multiple myeloma. Elranatamab is a bispecific B-cell maturation antigen (BCMA)-directed CD3 T-cell engager. Elranatamab is given by subcutaneous injection.

The most common side effects include cytokine release syndrome, fatigue, injection site reaction, diarrhea, upper respiratory tract infection, musculoskeletal pain, pneumonia, decreased appetite, rash, cough, nausea, and pyrexia (fever).

Elranatamab was approved for medical use in the United States in August 2023, in the European Union in December 2023, and in Canada in December 2023.

== Medical uses ==
Elranatamab is indicated for the treatment of adults with relapsed or refractory multiple myeloma who have received at least four prior lines of therapy, including a proteasome inhibitor, an immunomodulatory agent, and an anti-CD38 monoclonal antibody.

== Adverse effects ==
The most common adverse reactions include cytokine release syndrome, fatigue, injection site reaction, diarrhea, upper respiratory tract infection, musculoskeletal pain, pneumonia, decreased appetite, rash, cough, nausea, and pyrexia.

The US Food and Drug Administration (FDA) prescribing information for elranatamab has a boxed warning for life-threatening or fatal cytokine release syndrome and neurologic toxicity, including immune effector cell-associated neurotoxicity.

== History ==
The safety and effectiveness of elranatamab was evaluated in MagnetisMM-3 (NCT04649359), an open-label, single-arm, multi-center study that included participants with relapsed/refractory multiple myeloma who are refractory to at least one proteasome inhibitor, one immunomodulatory drug, and one anti-CD38 antibody. Overall, the study consisted of 97 participants naïve to prior BCMA-directed therapy and who had previously received at least four prior lines of therapy, including a proteasome inhibitor, an immunomodulatory agent, and an anti-CD38 monoclonal antibody.

The FDA granted the application for elranatamab priority review, breakthrough therapy, and orphan drug designations; and granted approval of Elrexfio to Pfizer Inc.

== Society and culture ==
=== Legal status ===
In October 2023, the Committee for Medicinal Products for Human Use of the European Medicines Agency adopted a positive opinion, recommending the granting of a conditional marketing authorization for the medicinal product Elrexfio, intended for the treatment of multiple myeloma. The applicant for this medicinal product is Pfizer Europe MA EEIG.

In 2023, elranatamab was approved for medical use in the United States, in the European Union, and in Canada.

=== Brand names ===
Elranatamab is the international nonproprietary name.

Elranatamab is sold under the brand name Elrexfio.
