= Adiphenine =

Names
- Preferred IUPAC name 2-(Diethylamino)ethyl diphenylacetate
- Other names Diphacil

Identifiers
CAS Number	64-95-9
3D model (JSmol)	Interactive image
ChEMBL	ChEMBL353846
ChemSpider	1953
DrugBank	DB15795
ECHA InfoCard	100.000.545
EC Number	200-599-0
KEGG	D02772
MeSH	C084829
PubChem CID	2031
UNII	YKG6OR043Q
CompTox Dashboard (EPA)	DTXSID0022561
- InChI: InChI=1S/C20H25NO2/c1-3-21(4-2)15-16-23-20(22)19(17-11-7-5-8-12-17)18-13-9-6-10-14-18/h5-14,19H,3-4,15-16H2,1-2H3 Key: JGOAIQNSOGZNBX-UHFFFAOYSA-N; InChI=1/C20H25NO2/c1-3-21(4-2)15-16-23-20(22)19(17-11-7-5-8-12-17)18-13-9-6-10-14-18/h5-14,19H,3-4,15-16H2,1-2H3 Key: JGOAIQNSOGZNBX-UHFFFAOYAN
- SMILES: CCN(CC)CCOC(=O)C(C1=CC=CC=C1)C2=CC=CC=C2

Properties
Chemical formula	C_{20}H_{25}NO_{2}
Molar mass	311.425 g·mol^{−1}
Melting point	112–114 °C (234–237 °F; 385–387 K)

Hazards
- Lethal dose or concentration (LD, LC)
LD_{50} (median dose)	290 mg/kg (mouse; intraperitoneal)
- Except where otherwise noted, data are given for materials in their standard state (at 25 °C [77 °F], 100 kPa). Infobox references

Adiphenine is an inhibitor of nicotinic receptors.

== See also ==
- Dicycloverine
