= Ketocaine =

Chemical compound

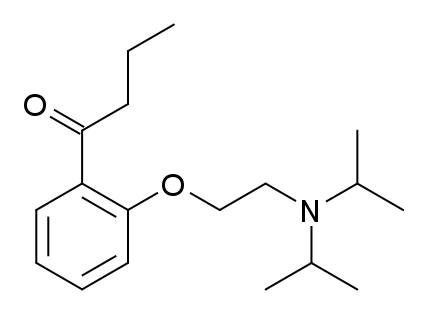

Clinical data
- ATC code: None

Identifiers
- IUPAC name: 1-[2-[2-[di(propan-2-yl)amino]ethoxy]phenyl]butan-1-one
- CAS Number: 1092-46-2 14549-32-7 (HCl)
- PubChem CID: 68946
- ChemSpider: 62170
- UNII: WA1RT89G9X
- CompTox Dashboard (EPA): DTXSID90862533
- ECHA InfoCard: 100.012.847

Chemical and physical data
- Formula: C_{18}H_{29}NO_{2}
- Molar mass: 291.435 g·mol^{−1}
- 3D model (JSmol): Interactive image
- SMILES: CCCC(=O)C1=CC=CC=C1OCCN(C(C)C)C(C)C
- InChI: InChI=InChI=1S/C18H29NO2/c1-6-9-17(20)16-10-7-8-11-18(16)21-13-12-19(14(2)3)15(4)5/h7-8,10-11,14-15H,6,9,12-13H2,1-5H3; Key:UXAWFWFJXIANHZ-UHFFFAOYSA-N

Ketocaine (INN; brand name Vericaina; former developmental codes Astra 2358 and A-2358) is an amino ether local anesthetic of the butyrophenone family used topically for pain relief. It is marketed in Italy.

== Synthesis ==
Williamson ether synthesis between 2'-hydroxybutyrophenone (1) and diisopropylaminoethyl chloride (2) gives ketocaine (3).

Synthesis of ketocaine
