= Elesclomol =

Chemical compound

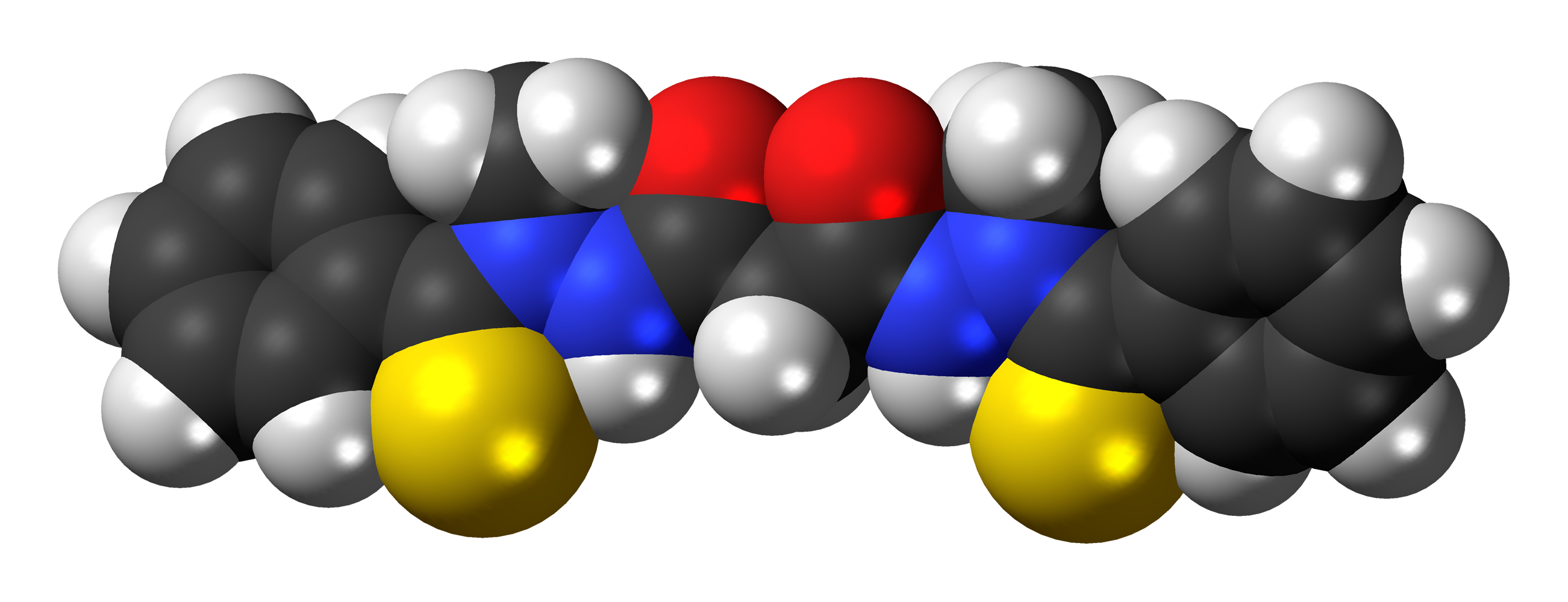

Clinical data
- ATC code: none

Identifiers
- IUPAC name: N′^{1},N′^{3}-dimethyl-N′^{1},N′^{3}- bis(phenylcarbonothioyl)propanedihydrazide
- CAS Number: 488832-69-5
- PubChem CID: 300471
- DrugBank: DB05719
- ChemSpider: 265501
- UNII: 6UK191M53P
- KEGG: D08909
- ChEBI: CHEBI:79369
- ChEMBL: ChEMBL1972860
- CompTox Dashboard (EPA): DTXSID2042642

Chemical and physical data
- Formula: C_{19}H_{20}N_{4}O_{2}S_{2}
- Molar mass: 400.52 g·mol^{−1}
- InChI: InChI=1S/C19H20N4O2S2/c1-22(18(26)14-9-5-3-6-10-14)20-16(24)13-17(25)21-23(2)19(27)15-11-7-4-8-12-15/h3-12H,13H2,1-2H3,(H,20,24)(H,21,25); Key:BKJIXTWSNXCKJH-UHFFFAOYSA-N

Elesclomol (INN, codenamed STA-4783) is a drug that triggers apoptosis (programmed cell death) in cancer cells. It is being developed by Synta Pharmaceuticals and GlaxoSmithKline as a chemotherapy adjuvant, and has received both fast track and orphan drug status from the U.S. Food and Drug Administration for the treatment of metastatic melanoma. Synta Pharmaceuticals announced on February 26, 2009, the suspension of all clinical trials involving Elesclomol due to safety concerns. In March 2010, Synta announced that the FDA had approved resuming clinical development of elesclomol, and that they expected to initiate one or more clinical trials for elesclomol in the second half of the year.

In a small, randomized phase II study, elesclomol was shown to significantly increase progression-free survival in people with metastatic melanoma when given in addition to paclitaxel (Taxol).

Results from a phase III trial were announced in March 2013. The study was halted when it was determined that addition of elesclomol to paclitaxel didn't significantly increase progression-free survival.

Studies in preclinical models suggested that Elesclomol may be effective in Ewing sarcoma cells with elevated levels of cellular oxidative stress.

== Mechanism of action ==
Elesclomol induces oxidative stress by provoking a buildup of reactive oxygen species within cancer cells. Elesclomol requires a redox active metal ion to function. The Cu(II) complex is 34 times more potent than the Ni(II) complex and 1040-fold more potent than the Pt(II) complex.

== Discovery ==
Elesclomol was first synthesized at Shinogi BioResearch in Lexington, MA. Its efficacy against cancer was discovered by scientists at Shionogi BioResearch. “It was pure chemist’s joy,” Synta's Chen said. “Homemade, random, and clearly made for no particular purpose. It was the only one that worked on everything we tried.”
