= Ensartinib =

Medication

Clinical data
- Trade names: Ensacove
- Other names: X-396
- AHFS/Drugs.com: Monograph
- MedlinePlus: a625004
- License data: US DailyMed: Ensartinib
- Routes of administration: By mouth
- ATC code: None

Legal status
- Legal status: US: ℞-only

Identifiers
- CAS Number: 1370651-20-9
- PubChem CID: 56960363
- DrugBank: DB14860
- ChemSpider: 58828042
- UNII: SMA5ZS5B22
- KEGG: D11346
- ChEMBL: ChEMBL4113131
- ECHA InfoCard: 100.306.918

Chemical and physical data
- Formula: C_{26}H_{27}Cl_{2}FN_{6}O_{3}
- Molar mass: 561.44 g·mol^{−1}
- 3D model (JSmol): Interactive image
- SMILES: C[C@@H](OC1=C(N)N=NC(=C1)C(=O)NC2=CC=C(C=C2)C(=O)N3C[C@H](C)N[C@H](C)C3)C4=C(Cl)C(F)=CC=C4Cl
- InChI: InChI=1S/C26H27Cl2FN6O3/c1-13-11-35(12-14(2)31-13)26(37)16-4-6-17(7-5-16)32-25(36)20-10-21(24(30)34-33-20)38-15(3)22-18(27)8-9-19(29)23(22)28/h4-10,13-15,31H,11-12H2,1-3H3,(H2,30,34)(H,32,36)/t13-,14+,15-/m1/s1; Key:GLYMPHUVMRFTFV-QLFBSQMISA-N

Ensartinib, sold under the brand name Ensacove, is an anti-cancer medication used for the treatment of non-small cell lung cancer. Ensartinib is an anaplastic lymphoma kinase inhibitor used as the salt ensartinib hydrochloride. It is taken by mouth.

The most common adverse reactions include rash, musculoskeletal pain, constipation, cough, pruritis, nausea, edema, pyrexia, and fatigue.

Ensartinib was approved for medical use in the United States in December 2024.

== Medical uses ==
Ensartinib is indicated for the treatment of adults with anaplastic lymphoma kinase (ALK)-positive locally advanced or metastatic non-small cell lung cancer who have not previously received an ALK-inhibitor.

== History ==
Efficacy was evaluated in eXALT3 (NCT02767804), an open-label, randomized, active-controlled, multicenter trial in 290 participants with locally advanced or metastatic ALK-positive non-small cell lung cancer who had not previously received an ALK-targeted therapy. Participants were randomized 1:1 to receive ensartinib or crizotinib.

== Society and culture ==
=== Legal status ===
Ensartinib was approved for medical use in the United States in December 2024.

In September 2026, the Committee for Medicinal Products for Human Use of the European Medicines Agency adopted a positive opinion, recommending the granting of a marketing authorization for the medicinal product Gevalka, intended for the treatment of adults with anaplastic lymphoma kinase (ALK)-positive, advanced non-small cell lung cancer (NSCLC). The applicant for this medicinal product is SFL Pharmaceuticals Deutschland.

=== Names ===
Ensartinib is the international nonproprietary name.

Ensartinib is sold under the brand name Ensacove.
