= Ecromeximab =

Monoclonal antibody

Monoclonal antibody
- Type: Whole antibody
- Source: Chimeric (mouse/human)
- Target: GD3 ganglioside

Clinical data
- ATC code: none

Identifiers
- CAS Number: 292819-64-8
- ChemSpider: none
- UNII: M76FX2JZRM

Chemical and physical data
- Molar mass: 145255 g/mol

Ecromeximab is a chimeric monoclonal antibody being developed for the treatment of melanoma.

The drug was developed by Kyowa Hakko Kogyo Co., Ltd. As of December 2015 development had been discontinued.
