= Erbulozole =

Chemical compound

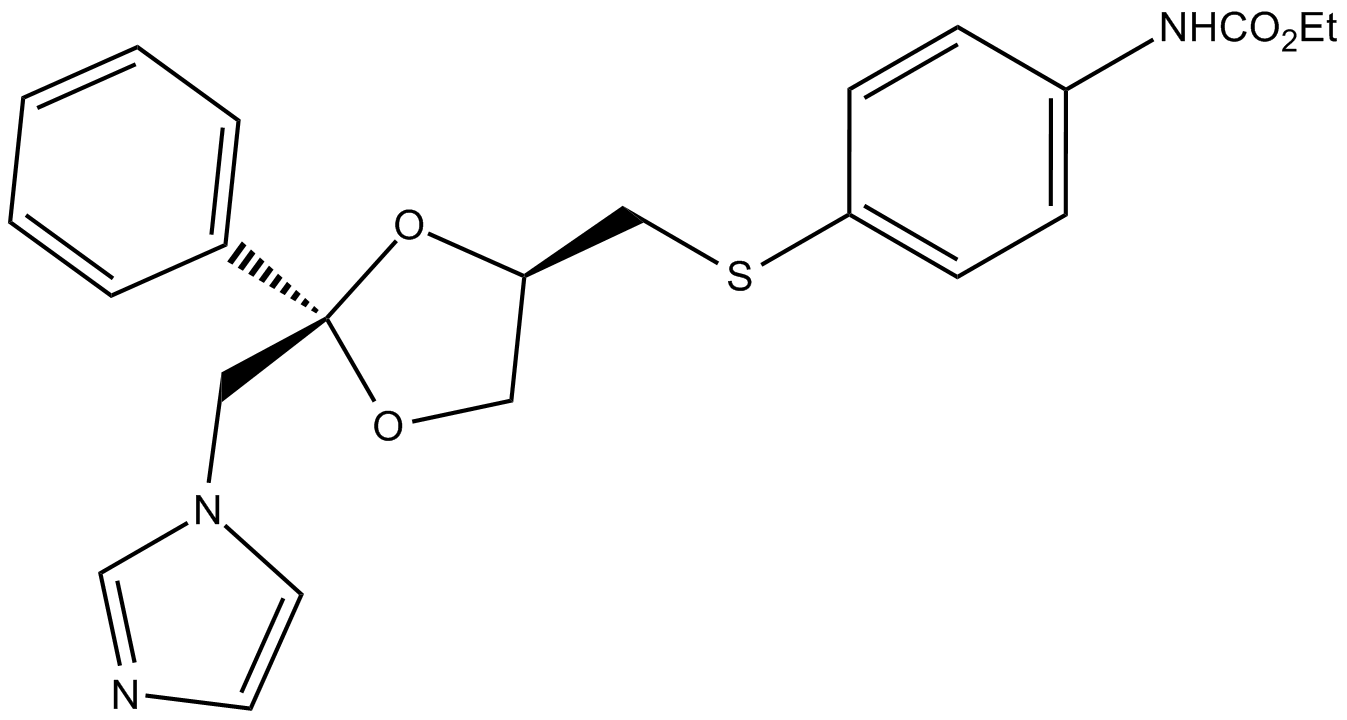

Clinical data
- Other names: Erbuzole

Identifiers
- CAS Number: 124784-31-2
- PubChem CID: 9934372
- ChemSpider: 8110000
- UNII: 78XGN2K5RX

Chemical and physical data
- Formula: C_{24}H_{27}N_{3}O_{5}S
- Molar mass: 469.56 g·mol^{−1}
- 3D model (JSmol): Interactive image
- SMILES: CCOC(=O)NC1=CC=C(C=C1)SC[C@H]2CO[C@](O2)(CN3C=CN=C3)C4=CC=C(C=C4)OC
- InChI: InChI=1S/C24H27N3O5S/c1-3-30-23(28)26-19-6-10-22(11-7-19)33-15-21-14-31-24(32-21,16-27-13-12-25-17-27)18-4-8-20(29-2)9-5-18/h4-13,17,21H,3,14-16H2,1-2H3,(H,26,28)/t21-,24+/m1/s1; Key:KLEPCGBEXOCIGS-QPPBQGQZSA-N

Erbulozole (R55104) is a congener of the microtubule inhibitor tubulozole. It is undergoing phase I clinical trials as a chemotherapeutic agent.

== Synthesis ==
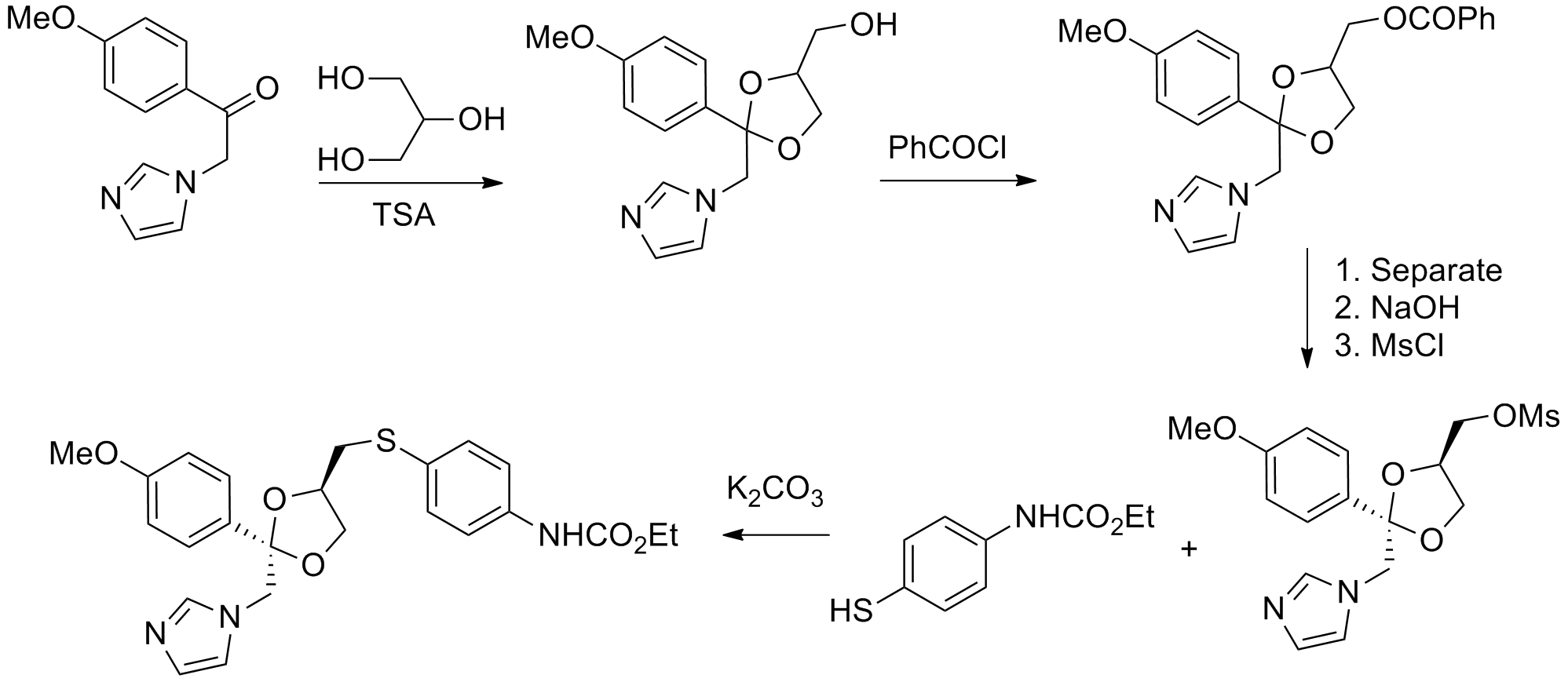
Erbulozole synthesis: Lednicer book 6 (Drugs of the Future citation).

== Other reading ==
- Distelmans W, VanGinckel P, Heeres J, Van der Veken LJ (1991). "Erbulozole. Antineoplastic, Microtubule inhibitor". Drugs Future. 16 (6): 577.
