= Enisamium iodide =

Chemical compound

- Chemical formula

Clinical data
- Trade names: Amizon
- Other names: Carbabenzpiride; 4-(N-Benzyl) aminocarbonyl-1-methylpyridinium iodide; N-Methyl-4-benzylurebamidopyridinium iodide
- ATC code: J05AX17 (WHO)

Pharmacokinetic data
- Metabolism: liver
- Excretion: kidneys

Identifiers
- IUPAC name: N-benzyl-1-methylpyridin-1-ium-4-carboxamide iodide
- CAS Number: 201349-37-3
- PubChem CID: 10089466
- ChemSpider: 8265003
- UNII: G22FG6Q00B
- KEGG: D11249
- ChEMBL: ChEMBL1716983
- CompTox Dashboard (EPA): DTXSID00173960

Chemical and physical data
- Formula: C_{14}H_{15}IN_{2}O
- Molar mass: 354.191 g·mol^{−1}
- 3D model (JSmol): Interactive image
- SMILES: C[N+]1=CC=C(C=C1)C(=O)NCC2=CC=CC=C2.[I-]
- InChI: InChI=1S/C14H14N2O.HI/c1-16-9-7-13(8-10-16)14(17)15-11-12-5-3-2-4-6-12;/h2-10H,11H2,1H3;1H; Key:ILSOAHPXYZRFBA-UHFFFAOYSA-N

Enisamium iodide is a derivative of isonicotinic acid. Based on its systematic chemical name of N-benzyl-1-methylpyridin-1-ium-4-carboxamide iodide, the shortened name carbabenzpiride is sometimes used. Enisamium iodide is a registered antiviral drug sold in Ukraine, Kazakhstan, Mongolia, Belarus, and other Eastern European countries under the trade names Amizon, Amizon Max, Amizonchik.

In 2019, the World Health Organization assigned enisamium iodide ATC code – J05AX17 (Antivirals for systemic use of direct action) and included it in the ATC / DDD index.

== History ==
The compound enisamium iodide was first synthesized by scientists of the Institute of Pharmacology and Toxicology of the National Academy of Medical Sciences of Ukraine. In 1997, enisamium iodide was registered as a non-narcotic analgesic and antipyretic. However, it is no longer used for these indications. Amizon is marketed as an antiviral drug for the treatment and prevention of influenza and SARS.

In 2005, Doctor of Medical Sciences, Professor, and a corresponding member of the National Academy of Sciences and the National Academy of Medical Sciences of Ukraine, Frolov was the first to demonstrate the antiviral activity of enisamium iodide in in-vitro experiments.

Recent studies have shown that the antiviral effect of enisamium is due to inhibition of viral RNA polymerase of influenza virus.

Since 2008, the non-clinical program, which included a set of pharmacological, pharmacokinetic and toxicological studies, has been performed in several research institutes and laboratories in Germany, the United Kingdom, the Czech Republic, the Netherlands, Switzerland and the United States.

== Pharmacological properties ==
=== Mechanism of action ===
The antiviral activity of enisamium iodide is associated with inhibition of influenza virus RNA polymerase. Enisamium iodide effectively inhibited SARS-CoV-2 virus replication in vitro in Caco-2 cells.

=== Pharmacodynamics ===
Enisamium has antiviral activity against various strains of influenza A (H1N1, H3N2, H5N1, H7N9), influenza B virus, respiratory syncytial virus, as well as strains of alpha-coronavirus NL-63 and beta-coronavirus SARS-CoV-2, etc. In vitro studies using influenza virus-infected normal human bronchial epithelial cells conducted at the Illinois Institute of Technology Research Institute (IITRI), Chicago, USA, showed a decrease in viral titers due to incubation with enisamium iodide (24 FAV00A). year on 3 log (1000 times). In addition, the polymerase chain reaction with reverse transcription revealed suppression of the expression of the M-gene of influenza virus by almost 2 orders of magnitude.

== Medical use ==
Amizon tablets are indicated for the treatment and prevention of influenza and acute respiratory viral infections. Amizon Max and Amizonchik syrup according to the instructions for medicines are intended for the treatment of influenza and SARS. Amizon Max is also used to treat COVID-19 of moderate severity in combination with basic therapy.

== Clinical efficacy and safety ==
In 2010, the third phase of clinical trials on the basis of FBDU "Research Institute of Influenza" of the Ministry of Health of the Russian Federation (St. Petersburg, Russia) was completed with 100 patients (60 patients with influenza and SARS received enisamium iodide, 40 – placebo).

In the enisamium iodide group, the mean duration of fever was shown to be 2.7 days, and in the placebo group, 3.8 days. Thus, as a result of taking enisamium iodide, the duration of fever was reduced by an average of 1.1 days. When assessing well-being, a significant improvement on the 3rd day of treatment was noted by 43.3% of patients in the main group and 15% in the control group (p <0.001). On day 7 of treatment, almost all patients (59 out of 60) who received enisamium iodide returned to their usual way of life, while 37.5% of those who took placebo continued to feel unwell and had not yet returned to normal. work and leisure.

Enisamium was more effective when treatment was started earlier.

From May 2020 to March 2021, a batotocent clinical placebo-controlled, double-blind, randomized trial of enisamium iodide (Amizon Max) in patients with moderate to severe COVID-19 was conducted at 14 health care facilities in Ukraine. receiving inpatient treatment.

The results of the clinical trial allowed to include in the instructions for medical use of the drug Amizon Max new indications for use, in particular - the treatment of COVID-19 moderate severity in combination with basic therapy.
