= Enloplatin =

Pharmaceutical drug

Clinical data
- Other names: Enloplatine, enloplatino, enloplatinum

Pharmacokinetic data
- Bioavailability: 100% (IV)
- Protein binding: > 85%
- Elimination half-life: 56±40 hours (Whole blood); 52±40 hours (Blood plasma)
- Excretion: Renal

Identifiers
- IUPAC name: [4-(azanidylmethyl)oxan-4-yl]methylazanide;cyclobutane-1,1-dicarboxylate;platinum(4+)
- CAS Number: 111523-41-2
- PubChem CID: 56840924
- ChemSpider: 61983
- UNII: C7HT2IO79H
- CompTox Dashboard (EPA): DTXSID80912197

Chemical and physical data
- Formula: C_{13}H_{20}N_{2}O_{5}Pt
- Molar mass: 479.396 g·mol^{−1}
- 3D model (JSmol): Interactive image
- Melting point: 260 to 263 °C (500 to 505 °F)
- Solubility in water: 450 (Note: As hydrate.) mg/mL (20 °C)
- SMILES: C1CC(C1)(C(=O)[O-])C(=O)[O-].C1COCCC1(C[NH-])C[NH-].[Pt+4]
- InChI: InChI=1S/C7H14N2O.C6H8O4.Pt/c8-5-7(6-9)1-3-10-4-2-7;7-4(8)6(5(9)10)2-1-3-6;/h8-9H,1-6H2;1-3H2,(H,7,8)(H,9,10);/q-2;;+4/p-2; Key:NAFFDQVVNWTDJD-UHFFFAOYSA-L

Enloplatin is a water-soluble cancer medication. It is a platinum-based antineoplastic investigated for treatment of platinum-refractory ovarian cancer, in which it was demonstrated to have minimal activity. This cancer is suspected to be at least partially cross-resistant with another third-generation platinum analog, zeniplatin, which also shows minimal antitumor activity in this type of cancer. Enloplatin was found to be cross-resistant with carboplatin.

Like zeniplatin and carboplatin, use of enloplatin causes manageable nephrotoxicity, no significant neurotoxicity or ototoxicity, and dose-limiting myelosuppression.

The drug was originally developed by Wyeth, but no further development since 2000 has been reported.

== Structure ==
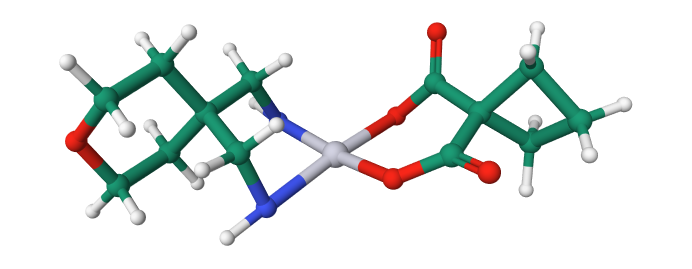
Ball-and-stick model of enloplatin

Like any platinum-based antineoplastic drug enloplatin is a coordination complex of platinum. Its two bidentate ligands are a tetrahydropyran-containing amine and cyclobutane dicarboxylic acid (CBDCA). Its CBDCA ligand is identical to that of carboplatin. It was found to have similar pharmacokinetics to carboplatin, indicating it is the CBDCA ligand and not the amine that most influences plasma pharmacokinetics of these platinum complexes.
