= Eterobarb =

Chemical compound

Clinical data
- Routes of administration: Oral
- ATC code: none

Identifiers
- IUPAC name: 5-ethyl-1,3-bis(methoxymethyl)-5-phenyl-1,3-diazinane-2,4,6-trione
- CAS Number: 27511-99-5
- PubChem CID: 33925
- ChemSpider: 31271
- UNII: 432SI047GA
- KEGG: D04077
- CompTox Dashboard (EPA): DTXSID9045710

Chemical and physical data
- Formula: C_{16}H_{20}N_{2}O_{5}
- Molar mass: 320.345 g·mol^{−1}
- 3D model (JSmol): Interactive image
- SMILES: CCC1(C(=O)N(C(=O)N(C1=O)COC)COC)C2=CC=CC=C2
- InChI: InChI=1S/C16H20N2O5/c1-4-16(12-8-6-5-7-9-12)13(19)17(10-22-2)15(21)18(11-23-3)14(16)20/h5-9H,4,10-11H2,1-3H3; Key:DACOQFZGGLCXMA-UHFFFAOYSA-N

Eterobarb (Antilon) is a barbiturate derivative. It has mainly anticonvulsant action with less sedative effects than the closely related compound phenobarbital. It saw reasonable success in clinical trials, but is not in widespread medical use.

== Synthesis ==
Eterobarb can be synthesized by reacting phenobarbital with chloromethyl methyl ether in presence of a base.

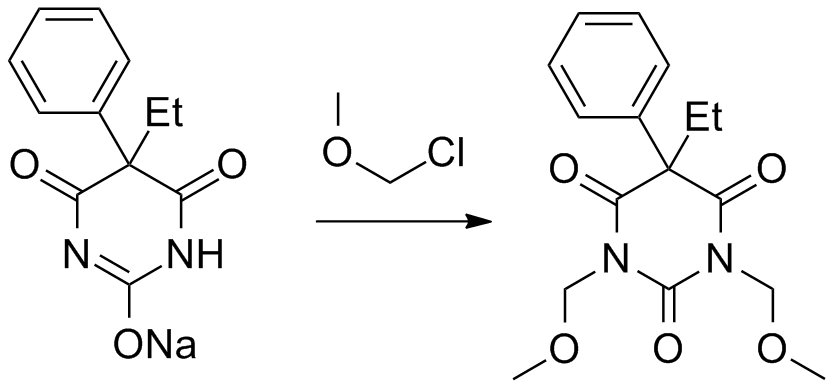
Eterobarb synthesis
