= Estrofurate =

Chemical compound

Identifiers
- IUPAC name: [(9S,13S,14S,17S)-17-(Furan-3-yl)-17-hydroxy-13-methyl-9,11,12,14,15,16-hexahydro-6H-cyclopenta[a]phenanthren-3-yl] acetate
- CAS Number: 10322-73-3
- PubChem CID: 66360
- ChemSpider: 59738
- UNII: 0CDE7T54KW
- KEGG: D04069
- ChEMBL: ChEMBL2104224
- CompTox Dashboard (EPA): DTXSID60883114

Chemical and physical data
- Formula: C_{24}H_{26}O_{4}
- Molar mass: 378.468 g·mol^{−1}
- 3D model (JSmol): Interactive image
- SMILES: CC(=O)OC1=CC2=C(C=C1)C3CCC4(C(C3=CC2)CCC4(C5=COC=C5)O)C
- InChI: InChI=1S/C24H26O4/c1-15(25)28-18-4-6-19-16(13-18)3-5-21-20(19)7-10-23(2)22(21)8-11-24(23,26)17-9-12-27-14-17/h4-6,9,12-14,20,22,26H,3,7-8,10-11H2,1-2H3/t20-,22+,23+,24-/m1/s1; Key:AEVUURWLDCELOV-AYVPJYCDSA-N

Estrofurate (INN, USAN; development code AY-11483; also known as 17α-(3-furyl)-estra-1,3,5(10),7-tetraene-3,17-diol 3-acetate) is a synthetic, steroidal estrogen that was synthesized in 1967 and studied in the late 1960s and early 1970s but was never marketed. It is a relatively weak estrogen in bioassays.
