= Exbivirumab =

Monoclonal antibody

Monoclonal antibody
- Type: Whole antibody
- Source: Human
- Target: hepatitis B surface antigen

Clinical data
- ATC code: none

Identifiers
- CAS Number: 569658-80-6
- ChemSpider: none
- UNII: 5Q374M1S1P

Chemical and physical data
- Formula: C_{6416}H_{9924}N_{1732}O_{1982}S_{44}
- Molar mass: 144446.75 g·mol^{−1}

Exbivirumab is a human monoclonal antibody developed for the treatment of hepatitis B infections.
