= Efungumab =

Chemical compound

Monoclonal antibody
- Type: Single-chain variable fragment
- Source: Human
- Target: fungal Hsp90

Clinical data
- Trade names: Mycograb
- Routes of administration: Intravenous
- ATC code: none

Pharmacokinetic data
- Bioavailability: Not applicable (IV only)
- Protein binding: High
- Elimination half-life: 1–2 hours

Identifiers
- CAS Number: 762260-74-2
- DrugBank: DB16151
- ChemSpider: none
- UNII: BM86P708HW
- KEGG: D09711

Chemical and physical data
- Molar mass: Approximately 27.2 kg/mol

Efungumab (trade name Mycograb) was a drug developed by NeuTec Pharma (a subsidiary of Novartis), intended to treat candidemia (a bloodstream infection caused by pathogenic yeast) in combination with amphotericin B. The European Medicines Agency has twice refused to grant marketing authorization for Mycograb, citing product safety and quality issues.

Chemically, efungumab is a single-chain variable fragment of a human monoclonal antibody. As such, it "grabs" onto fungal hsp90, hence its proposed trade name.

Its ability to potentiate the effects of the antifungal amphotericin B in culture were later found to be non-specific.
