= Ensituximab =

Monoclonal antibody

Monoclonal antibody
- Type: Whole antibody
- Source: Chimeric (mouse/human)
- Target: MUC5AC

Clinical data
- ATC code: none

Identifiers
- CAS Number: 1092658-06-4
- ChemSpider: none
- UNII: F988K568V2
- KEGG: D09898

Chemical and physical data
- Formula: C_{6342}H_{9800}N_{1678}O_{1985}S_{46}
- Molar mass: 142788.68 g·mol^{−1}

Ensituximab (NPC-1C) is a chimeric monoclonal antibody under development for as a candidate for treatment of cancers. The target of the antibody is uncertain and is described as "human colorectal and pancreatic carcinoma-associated antigens", a set of tumor antigens isolated from human cancers. The target might be Mucin 5AC.

The antibody was discovered by scientists at Neogenix Oncology using tumor antigens that had been identified years earlier by Ariel Hollinshead; the founder of Neogenix had founded a prior company based on Hollinshead's work as well. Neogenix worked with Selexis to develop the CHO cell line expressing ensituximab and also worked with Goodwin Biotechnology Inc on process development.

Ensituximab was granted orphan drug designation for pancreatic cancer by the FDA in 2010.

In 2011 Neogenix was forced to declare bankruptcy because the SEC opened an investigation into its use of unregistered broker-dealers in the course of raising $30M, and it could not raise further funds; in 2012 Neogenix sold its assets to a group of its investors who had formed a company called Precision Biologics.

In 2016, Precision released data from a Phase II trial colorectal cancer and at that time was working with Cytovance Biologics as its contract manufacturing organization.
