= Etymemazine =

Chemical compound

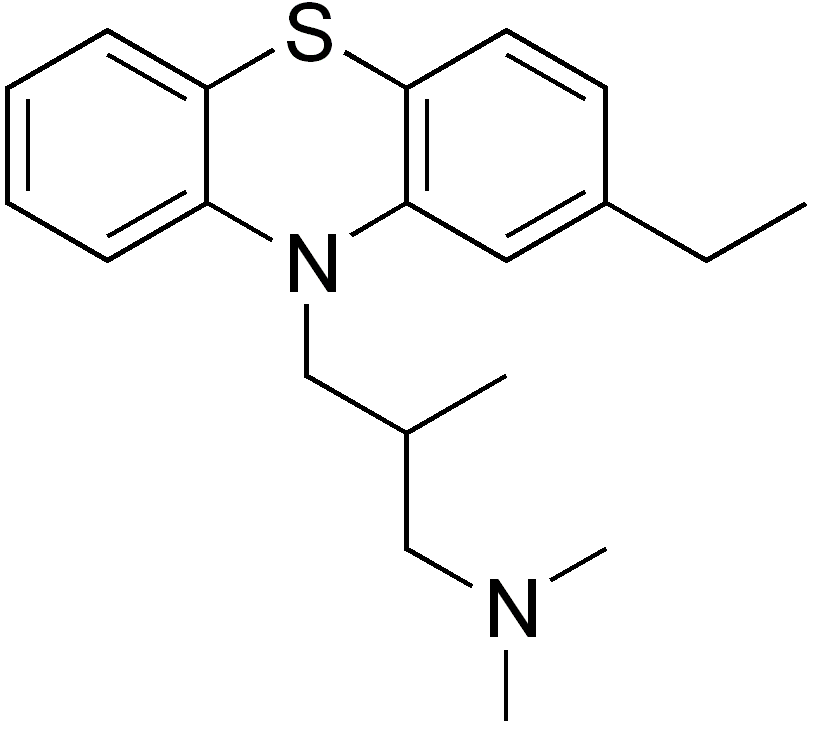

Clinical data
- Other names: Ethylisobutrazine
- AHFS/Drugs.com: International Drug Names
- ATC code: none

Identifiers
- IUPAC name: 3-(2-ethylphenothiazin-10-yl)-N,N,2-trimethylpropan-1-amine
- CAS Number: 523-54-6; HCl: 3737-33-5
- PubChem CID: 71823
- ChemSpider: 64847
- UNII: 861J4K81C7; HCl: A7002E7T2Z
- ChEMBL: ChEMBL1967567
- CompTox Dashboard (EPA): DTXSID0046935

Chemical and physical data
- Formula: C_{20}H_{26}N_{2}S
- Molar mass: 326.50 g·mol^{−1}
- 3D model (JSmol): Interactive image
- SMILES: CCC(C=C3)=CC2=C3SC1=CC=CC=C1N2CC(C)CN(C)C
- InChI: InChI=1S/C20H26N2S/c1-5-16-10-11-20-18(12-16)22(14-15(2)13-21(3)4)17-8-6-7-9-19(17)23-20/h6-12,15H,5,13-14H2,1-4H3; Key:USKHCLAXJXCWMO-UHFFFAOYSA-N

Etymemazine is an antipsychotic, antihistamine and anticholinergic drug of the phenothiazine chemical class, structurally related to cyamemazine and methotrimeprazine.

== Synthesis ==
Etymemazine can be synthesized by S_{N}2 alkylation of 2-ethylphenothiazine (1) with 1-dimethylamino-2-methyl-3-chloropropane (2) using sodamide as a base.

Synthesis of etymemazine
