= Cefepime/enmetazobactam =

Medication

Combination of
- Cefepime: cephalosporin
- Enmetazobactam: beta-lactamase inhibitor

Clinical data
- Trade names: Exblifep
- AHFS/Drugs.com: Monograph
- License data: US DailyMed: Cefepime hydrochloride, enmetazobactam
- Routes of administration: Intravenous
- ATC code: J01DE51 (WHO)

Legal status
- Legal status: US: ℞-only; EU: Rx-only

Identifiers
- KEGG: D12818

Cefepime/enmetazobactam, sold under the brand name Exblifep, is a medication used for the treatment of urinary tract infections. It is a fixed dose combination containing cefepime, a cephalosporin antibacterial; and enmetazobactam, a beta-lactamase inhibitor.

The combination was approved for medical use in the United States in February 2024, and in the European Union in March 2024.

== Medical uses ==
In the US, cefepime/enmetazobactam is indicated for the treatment of people with complicated urinary tract infections including pyelonephritis, caused by the following susceptible microorganisms: Escherichia coli, Klebsiella pneumoniae, Pseudomonas aeruginosa, Proteus mirabilis, and Enterobacter cloacae complex.

In the EU, cefepime/enmetazobactam is indicated for the treatment of complicated urinary tract infections, including pyelonephritis; hospital-acquired pneumonia, including ventilator-associated pneumonia; and the treatment of people with bacteremia that occurs in association with, or is suspected to be associated with, any of the infections listed above.

== History ==
Enmetazobactam was invented by Orchid Pharma in India and then out-licensed to Allecra Therapeutics for further development.

== Society and culture ==
=== Legal status ===
The combination was approved for medical use in the United States in February 2024.

In January 2024, the Committee for Medicinal Products for Human Use of the European Medicines Agency adopted a positive opinion, recommending the granting of a marketing authorization for the medicinal product Exblifep, intended for the treatment of urinary tract infections and pneumonia in adults. The applicant for this medicinal product is Advanz Pharma Limited. The combination was approved for medical use in the European Union in March 2024.

=== Names ===
The combination cefepime/enmetazobactam is sold under the brand name Exblifep.
