= Huawei E5 =

Mobile Wi-Fi device

E5
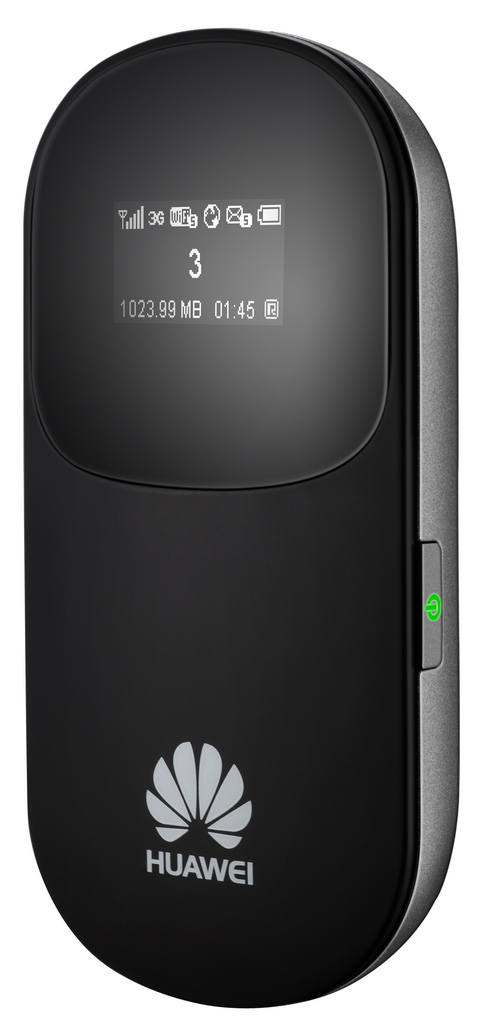
- Huawei E585
- Developer: Huawei
- Type: Mobile Wi-Fi device
- Released: February 2009
- Storage: Up to 32 GB external storage
- Input: USB 2.0
- Weight: 90g/81g
- Website: Huawei E5 WiFi Devices

The E5 is a mobile Wi-Fi device produced by Huawei Technologies, and is part of the company's mobile Wi-Fi series that includes the E5830s, E585, E583c and E586. The E5 series connect to other devices using a wireless interface. The devices are pocket size and allow users to access the Internet through any Wi-Fi device, mobile phone, game console, digital camera, notebook and personal digital assistant (PDA).

== Products ==
=== E5 ===
Huawei launched the E5 at the Mobile World Congress in Barcelona in February 2009. It was originally named the E583X and is also known as the E5830/E5852. The E5 offers high-speed wireless connectivity, providing users with group internet access, individual Wi-Fi hotspots and connection to devices such as notebooks, digital cameras and games consoles. It also allows users to play games online and transfer pictures.

The E5 is 95mm × 48mm × 13mm, 90g in weight and is equipped with a microSD card with storage capacity of up to 32 GB. It can support networks such as GSM, EDGE, GPRS, UMTS and HSPA and comes with five LED indicators. The E5 has download speeds of 7.2 Mbit/s and uplink speeds of 5.76 Mbit/s.

=== E5830s ===
The E5830s mobile Wi-Fi device connects to devices using its wireless interface, providing Internet access through any Wi-Fi device, mobile phone, game console, digital camera, notebook and PDA. Key features include: intelligent power control, temperature protection, web messages, web SD card information sharing, small screen page setting and screen display of statuses.

=== E585 ===
Huawei developed the E585 based on feedback from consumers and UK wireless carrier 3, including a start-up button and OLED display detailing information such as signal strength, 3G or HSDPA connectivity, number of devices connected to the hub, battery level, and the network being used. It is equipped with a personal mobile Wi-Fi hotspot for a maximum of five compatible devices including notebooks, iPads, or handheld gaming consoles simultaneously. The E585 is compatible with Windows, Mac and Linux.

=== E583c ===
Huawei announced the launch of its next-generation mobile Wi-Fi device, the E583C in July 2010. The device was based on the original E5, but the company stated that it had made further improvements to the E583c's performance and stability. The E583c converts 3.5G HSPA mobile signal into Wi-Fi coverage, automatically creating Internet access and individual Wi-Fi hotspots for up to five Wi-Fi-enabled digital devices. It can also provide simultaneous Internet access to a sixth device when it is connected to a laptop computer via a USB cable. The E583c weighs 90 grams and features a 1-inch color OLED display that shows information such as network operator details, signal strength, Wi-Fi connection status, and battery level. It enables wireless data transmission or online gaming on a range of Wi-Fi-enabled digital devices, including iPads, iPod Touch, netbooks, laptop computers, portable multimedia centers, game consoles, PDAs, mobile phones and digital cameras.

The E583c is compatible with Windows, Mac or Linux and has data transmission speeds of up to 5.76 Mbit/s (uplink) and 7.2 Mbit/s (download). It also has a built-in microSD memory card slot (maximum 32 GB) that can be used as a USB memory stick. Linux requires a driver that is not shipped with the unit.

=== E586 ===
On 17 August 2011, UK 3 announced its new high-speed mobile Wi-Fi device: the Huawei-built E586 MiFi, the first mobile Wi-Fi device in the UK to feature next generation HSPA+ mobile broadband technology. Compared with the E585, the E586 provides users with approximately 40% faster download and uplink, offering 21.1 Mbit/s download (HSDPA) and 5.76 Mbit/s uplink (HSUPA). Similarly to previous models, the E586's features include Wi-Fi for iPads, laptops or handheld games consoles. The E586 also features an OLED screen displaying information such as the amount of data used, speed of the current connection and length of browsing time, as well as a newly designed dashboard for viewing text messages and changing settings. A new feature of the E586 allows users to see their Wi-Fi user name and password on screen for pairing with new gadgets. The device has an internal memory slot for microSD card that supports up to 32 GB and approximately 4.5 hours battery life.

=== E587 ===
The Huawei E587 was presented at the Mobile World Congress in 2011. Compared to the earlier products Huawei doubles (50%) the download and upload speed. Customers getting up to 42.2 Mbit/s throughout the DC-HSPA+ technology. The upload speed provides 11 Mbit/s (HSUPA). Beside WiFi IEEE 802.11 b/g the Huawei E587 also supports IEEE 802.11n. The OLED-Display expose signal strength with technology, current operator, battery lifetime, amount of the current WiFi users, incoming messages and internet connection status. The mobile Hotspot has an internal memory slot for microSD card that supports up to 32 GB and approximately 5 hours battery life (2200 mAh). Additionally the device has an external antenna connector (TS-9).

=== E589 ===
On 13 January 2012, Huawei unveils the world's first multi-mode WiFi device, the Huawei E589, at the CES. In comparison with the predecessor the Huawei E589 supports LTE category 3 (100 Mbit/s downlink and 50 Mbit/s uplink) and provides internet connection up to 10 devices. Connected to 3G the MiFi reaches download speed up to 42.2 Mbit/s. The E589 also features a TFT screen displaying information such as the amount of data used, speed of the current connection and length of browsing time. The mobile Hotspot has an internal memory slot for microSD card that supports up to 32 GB and approximately 6 hours battery life (3000 mAh). Additionally the device has an external antenna connector (TS-9). Vodafone offers a branded version, the R210, which is nearly similar to the original device.

=== E5786 ===
On 23 February 2014, Huawei introduced the world's first category 6 (up to 300 Mbit/s downlink) LTE mobile Hotspot at Mobile World Congress. Huawei uses a HiSilicon LTE Cat6 chipset that runs on a 28 nm HPM Cortex-A9 processor. Beside faster download speed the Huawei E5786 offers support for dual band (2.4/5 GHz) Wi-Fi ac including easy access by connecting with simply scanning a QR code.

== Specifications ==
=== Huawei E5830, E5830s, E583c and E585 ===
Model		E5830	E5830s	E583c	E585
Platform	Type	3G Datacard			
Platform	Band	HSUPA/HSDPA/UMTS 2100 MHz; GSM/GPRS/EDGE 850/900/1800/1900 MHz			
Platform	Transfer rate	HSUPA 5.76 Mbit/s; HSDPA 7.2 Mbit/s			
Platform	Receive diversity	HSUPA/HSDPA/UMTS 2100 MHz			
Interface		USB 2.0			
Wi-Fi		802.11b / 802.11g			
Encryption		WEP / WPA / WPA2			
Wi-Fi Connection Number		Up to 5 simultaneous users/devices			
Storage		External memory: Up to 32 GB			
Battery		1500 mAh		1400 mAh	1500 mAh
Appearance		Dimension (L × W × H): 95mm × 48mm × 13mm Weight: 90g Display: OLED	Dimension (L × W × H): 95mm x 48mm x 13mm Weight: 90g	Dimension (L × W × H): 86mm x 46.5mm x 10.5mm Weight: 90g	Dimension (L × W × H): 86mm x 46.5mm x 10.5mm Weight: 90g
Image		Huawei E5/E580	Huawei E580s	Huawei E583c	Huawei E585
Operating system		Windows 7 / Windows XP / Windows 2000 / Vista / Mac OS 10.4 / Mac OS 10.5			

=== Huawei E586, E587 and E589 ===
Model		E586	E587	E589
Typ		3G Datacard		4G Datacard
2G		850/900/1800/1900 MHz		
3G		900/2100 MHz	900/2100 MHz; 850/1700/1900/2100 MHz	900/2100 MHz
4G		no		900/1800/2100/2600 MHz; 800/900/1800/2100/2600 MHz
Max network speed down/upload		HSPA+: 21.6/5.76 Mbit/s	DC-HSPA+: 42.2/5.76 Mbit/s	LTE: 100/50 Mbit/s; DC-HSPA+: 42.2/5.76 Mbit/s
Interface		USB 2.0		
Wi-Fi		802.11b / 802.11g / 802.11n		
Encryption		WEP / WPA / WPA2		
Wi-Fi Connection Number		Up to 5 simultaneous users/devices	Up to 10 simultaneous users/devices	
Storage		External memory: Up to 32 GB		
Battery		1500 mAh	2200 mAh	3000 mAh
Appearance	Dimension (L × W × H)	86 mm x 46.5 mm x 10.5 mm	102 mm x 56 mm x 15.5 mm	113 mm x 62 × 13.5mm
Appearance	Weight	81g	110g	140g
Appearance	Display	OLED	?	?
Image		Huawei E586		
Operating system		Windows 7 / Windows XP / Windows 2000 / Vista / Mac OS 10.4 / Mac OS 10.5		

=== Huawei E5151, E5220 and E5221 ===
Model		E5151	E5220	E5221
Platform	Type	3G Datacard		
Platform	Band	UMTS/HSPA+ 900/2100 MHz; GSM/GPRS/EDGE 850/900/1800/1900 MHz		
Platform	Transfer rate	HSUPA 5.76 Mbit/s; HSPA+ 21.6 Mbit/s		
Platform	Receive diversity		850/1900/2100 MHz (HSUPA/HSDPA/UMTS)	
Interface		USB 2.0		
Wi-Fi		802.11b / 802.11g / 802.11n		
Encryption		WEP / WPA-PSK / WPA2-AES		
Wi-Fi simultaneous users/devices		Up to 10		
Storage		External memory: Up to 32 GB		
Battery		1500 mAh	1150 mAh	1500 mAh
Appearance	Dimension (L × W × H)	92.8 × 63.5 × 14.1 mm	71 × 67.5 × 13 mm	90.5 × 57 × 14.6 mm
Appearance	Weight	150g	60g	58g
Appearance	Display	LED light		
Image				
Operating system		Windows 8 / Windows 7 / Windows XP / Vista / Mac OS 10.5 / Mac OS 10.6 / Mac OS 10.7 / Mac OS 10.8		

=== Huawei E5330, E5331, E5332 and E5336 ===
Model		E5330	E5331	E5332	E5336
Platform	Type	3G Datacard			
Platform	Band	UMTS/HSPA+ 900/2100 MHz; GSM/GPRS/EDGE 850/900/1800/1900 MHz			
Platform	Transfer rate	HSUPA 5.76 Mbit/s; HSPA+ 21.6 Mbit/s			
Platform	Receive diversity	850/900/1800/1900 MHz (Quadband)			850/900/1800/1900 MHz
Interface		USB 2.0			
Wi-Fi		802.11b / 802.11g / 802.11n			
Encryption		WEP / WPA-PSK / WPA2-AES			?
Wi-Fi simultaneous users/devices		Up to 10	Up to 8		Up to 10
Storage		External memory: Up to 32 GB			?
Battery		1500 mAh			
Appearance	Dimension (L × W × H)	92.8 × 60 × 13.8 mm	92.8 × 60 × 12.8 mm	92.8 × 60 × 13.8 mm	110 x 72 x 36 mm
Appearance	Weight	74g	82g	91g	100g
Appearance	Display	LED light			1.45" LCD screen
Image					
Operating system		Windows 8 / Windows 7 / Windows XP / Vista / Mac OS 10.5 / Mac OS 10.6 / Mac OS 10.7 / Mac OS 10.8			

=== Huawei E5372, E5373 and E5377/E5377T/EC5377 ===
Model		E5372	E5373	E5377	E5377T	EC5377
Typ		4G Datacard				
2G		850/900/1800/1900 MHz			900/1800 MHz; 850/900/1800/1900 MHz	850/900/1800/1900 MHz
3G		850/900/1900/2100 MHz	900/2100 MHz		900/2100 MHz; 850/900/1900/2100 MHz	850/900/1900/2100 MHz
4G		900/1800/2100/2600 MHz; 800/900/1800/2100/2600 MHz	800/900/2100/2600 MHz; 800/900/1800/2100/2600 MHz	FDD-LTE: 700/1800/2600 MHz; FDD-LTE: 800/1800/2600 MHz; FDD-LTE: 700/1800/2600 MHz, TDD-LTE: 2300 MHz	800/900/2100/2600 MHz; 800/850/900/2100/2600 MHz	1800/1900/2100/2300/2600 MHz (Band 1, 2, 3, 38, 41)
Max network speed down/upload		LTE: 150/50 Mbit/s; DC-HSPA+: 42.2/5.76 Mbit/s		FDD-LTE: 150/50 Mbit/s; TDD-LTE: 112/10 Mbit/s; DC-HSPA+: 42.2/5.76 Mbit/s	LTE: 150/50 Mbit/s; DC-HSPA+: 42.2/5.76 Mbit/s	FDD-LTE: 150/50 Mbit/s; TDD-LTE: 112/10 Mbit/s; DC-HSPA+: 42.2/5.76 Mbit/s
Interface		USB 2.0				
Wi-Fi		802.11b / 802.11g / 802.11n				
Encryption		WEP / WPA / WPA2				
Wi-Fi simultaneous users/devices		Up to 10; Up to 5	Up to 11	Up to 10	Up to 11	Up to 10
Storage		External memory: Up to 32 GB				
Battery		3560 mAh (Telstra); 1780 mAh	1500 mAh		3560 mAh	1500 mAh
Appearance	Dimension (L × W × H)	99 mm × 62 mm × 14 mm	93.5 mm × 57.1 mm × 12.8 mm	90.8 mm × 57.1 mm × 14.4 mm	95 mm × 57.1 mm × 20 mm	99.5 mm × 57 mm × 14.4 mm
Appearance	Weight	130 g	82 g		136 g	<110 g
Appearance	Display	1.4" LCD	LED	1.45" LCD		
Image						
Operating system		Windows 8 / Windows 7 / Windows XP / Vista / Mac OS 10.5 / Mac OS 10.6 / Mac OS 10.7 / Mac OS 10.8				

=== Huawei E5573 ===
Model	E5573
Typ	4G Datacard
2G	850/900/1800/1900 MHz
3G	900/2100 MHz (Optus); 850/900/2100 MHz H3G UK
4G	LTE: 800/850/1800/2100/2600 MHz H3G UK; FDD-LTE: 700/1800/2100/2600 MHz, TDD-LTE: 2300 MHz (Optus)
Max network speed down/upload	FDD-LTE: 150/50 Mbit/s; TDD-LTE: 112/10 Mbit/s; DC-HSPA+: 42.2/5.76 Mbit/s
Interface	USB 2.0
Wi-Fi	802.11b / 802.11g / 802.11n
Encryption	WEP / WPA / WPA2
Wi-Fi Connection Number	Up to 10 simultaneous users/devices
Storage	External memory: N/A
Battery	1500 mAh
Appearance	Dimension (L x W x H): 96.8 mm x 58 mm x 12.8 mm Weight: 75g
Image	
Operating system	Windows 8 / Windows 7 / Windows XP / Vista / Mac OS 10.5 / Mac OS 10.6 / Mac OS 10.7 / Mac OS 10.8 / Linux

=== Huawei E5730, E5756, E5775 and E5776 ===
Model		E5730	E5756	E5775	E5776
Typ		3G Datacard		4G Datacard	
2G		850/900/1800/1900 MHz		unknown	900/1800 MHz; 850/900/1800/1900 MHz
3G		900/2100 MHz			900/2100 MHz; 850/900/1900/2100 MHz
4G		no		FDD-LTE: 1800/2100 MHz, TDD-LTE: 2300/2500/2600 MHz (Band 1, 3, 38, 40, 41)	FDD-LTE: 1700 MHz; FDD-LTE: 1800 MHz, TDD-LTE: 2300 MHz; 800/1800/2600 MHz; FDD-LTE: 800/1800/2600 MHz, TDD-LTE: 2600 MHz; FDD-LTE: 800/900/1800/2100/2600 MHz
Max network speed down/upload		DC-HSPA+: 42.2/5.76 Mbit/s		FDD-LTE: 150/50 Mbit/s; TDD-LTE: 112/10 Mbit/s; DC-HSPA+: 42.2/5.76 Mbit/s	
Interface		USB 2.0			
Wi-Fi		802.11b / 802.11g / 802.11n			
Encryption		WEP / WPA / WPA2			
Wi-Fi Connection Number		Up to 10 simultaneous users/devices			Up to 5 simultaneous users/devices: Wataniya; Up to 10 simultaneous users/devices
Storage		?	External memory: Up to 32 GB		
Battery		5200 mAh	3000 mAh	3560 mAh	3000 mAh
Appearance	Dimension (L × W × H)	99 mm x 66 mm x 23 mm	101.8 mm x 65.8 mm x 14.5 mm	?	106.4 mm x 66 × 15.5mm
Appearance	Weight	170g	150g	?	150g
Appearance	Display	1.45" LCD	?	?	1.45" LCD
Image					
Operating system		Windows 8 / Windows 7 / Windows XP / Vista / Mac OS 10.5 / Mac OS 10.6 / Mac OS 10.7 / Mac OS 10.8			

=== Huawei E5786 ===
Model	E5786
Typ	4G Datacard
2G	850/900/1800/1900 MHz
3G	850/2100 MHz (Telstra); 900/2100 MHz (Optus); 850/900/1900/2100 MHz (Bouygues, Huawei, SingTel, Telekom)
4G	FDD-LTE: 700/900/1800 MHz (Telstra); FDD-LTE: 900/1800/2100/2600 MHz (SingTel); FDD-LTE: 800/900/1800/2100/2600 MHz (Bouygues); FDD-LTE: 800/850/900/1800/2100/2600 MHz (Huawei, Telekom); FDD-LTE: 700/900/1800/2100/2600 MHz, TDD-LTE: 2300 MHz (Optus)
Max network speed down/upload	FDD-LTE: 300/50 Mbit/s; TDD-LTE: 224/?? Mbit/s; DC-HSPA+: 42.2/5.76 Mbit/s
Interface	USB 2.0
Wi-Fi	802.11b / 802.11g / 802.11n / 802.11ac
Encryption	WEP / WPA / WPA2
Wi-Fi Connection Number	Up to 10 simultaneous users/devices
Storage	External memory: Up to 32 GB
Battery	3000 mAh
Appearance	Dimension (L x W x H): 106 mm x 66 mm x 15.9 mm Weight: 155g
Image	
Operating system	Windows 8 / Windows 7 / Windows XP / Vista / Mac OS 10.5 / Mac OS 10.6 / Mac OS 10.7 / Mac OS 10.8

=== Huawei Mobile Wi-Fi E5878 ===
Model	Mobile Wi-Fi E5878
Typ	4G Datacard
2G	?
3G	?
4G	?
Max network speed down/upload	LTE: 150/50 Mbit/s; DC-HSPA+: 42.2/5.76 Mbit/s
Interface	USB 2.0
Wi-Fi	802.11b / 802.11g / 802.11n
Encryption	WEP / WPA / WPA2
Wi-Fi Connection Number	Up to 10 simultaneous users/devices
Storage	External memory: Up to ?? GB
Battery	1900 mAh
Appearance	Dimension (L x W x H): ? Weight: ?
Image	
Operating system	Windows 8 / Windows 7 / Windows XP / Vista / Mac OS 10.5 / Mac OS 10.6 / Mac OS 10.7 / Mac OS 10.8

== Reception and awards ==
By December 2009, shipments of the E5 wireless modem exceeded 300,000 units and orders had been placed by 40 network operators worldwide. Huawei's 2010 annual report stated that more than three million units of E5 had been sold around the world, as of August 2011. According to market research agency GfK Group, the E5 ranked number one in Japan for sales of wireless network cards with nearly 30% of market share.

The E5 series have received awards including: "Best iPad Accessory 2010" at the Macworld Awards 2010 and "Work Gadget of the Year" at the T3 Gadget Awards 2010, both for the Huawei E5.
