= Elsamitrucin =

Chemical compound

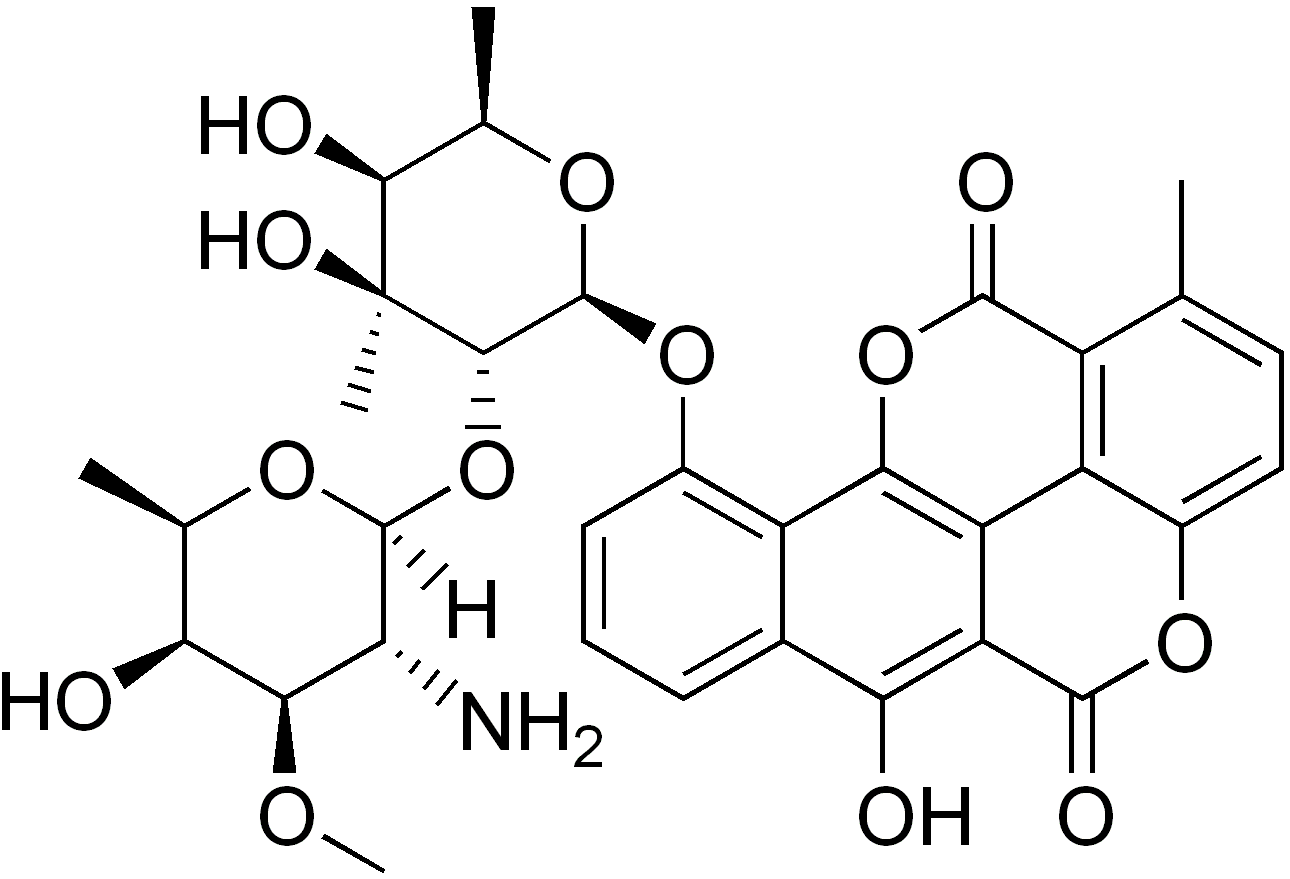

Clinical data
- Other names: Elsamicin A
- ATC code: none

Identifiers
- IUPAC name: 10-[3-(3-Amino-5-hydroxy-4-methoxy-6-methyltetrahydropyran-2-yloxy)-4,5-dihydroxy-4,6-dimethyltetrahydropyran-2-yloxy]-6-hydroxy-1-methylbenzo[h]chromeno[5,4,3-cde]chromene-5,12-dione
- CAS Number: 97068-30-9
- PubChem CID: 5362259
- ChemSpider: 4514988
- UNII: ZTV0FOB6NU
- CompTox Dashboard (EPA): DTXSID101028137

Chemical and physical data
- Formula: C_{33}H_{35}NO_{13}
- Molar mass: 653.637 g·mol^{−1}
- 3D model (JSmol): Interactive image
- SMILES: Cc1ccc2c3c1c(=O)oc4c3c(c(c5c4c(ccc5)O[C@H]6[C@@H]([C@@]([C@H]([C@H](O6)C)O)(C)O)O[C@@H]7[C@@H]([C@H]([C@H]([C@H](O7)C)O)OC)N)O)c(=O)o2
- InChI: InChI=1S/C33H35NO13/c1-11-9-10-16-19-17(11)29(38)46-25-18-14(24(36)21(20(19)25)30(39)44-16)7-6-8-15(18)45-32-28(33(4,40)27(37)13(3)43-32)47-31-22(34)26(41-5)23(35)12(2)42-31/h6-10,12-13,22-23,26-28,31-32,35-37,40H,34H2,1-5H3/t12-,13-,22-,23+,26-,27+,28+,31-,32+,33+/m1/s1; Key:MGQRRMONVLMKJL-KWJIQSIXSA-N

Elsamitrucin (elsamicin A) is a drug used in chemotherapy. Elsamitrucin is chemically related to chartreusin.
