= Exaprolol =

Names
- IUPAC name 1-(2-Cyclohexylphenoxy)-3-(propan-2-ylamino)propan-2-ol

Identifiers
| CAS Number | 55837-19-9 |
| 3D model (JSmol) | Interactive image |
| ChemSpider | 58934 |
| KEGG | D04120 |
| PubChem CID | 65485 |
| UNII | Q4XX54I93R |
| CompTox Dashboard (EPA) | DTXSID20866509 |
- InChI: InChI=1S/C18H29NO2/c1-14(2)19-12-16(20)13-21-18-11-7-6-10-17(18)15-8-4-3-5-9-15/h6-7,10-11,14-16,19-20H,3-5,8-9,12-13H2,1-2H3 Key: ABXHHEZNIJUQFM-UHFFFAOYSA-N
- SMILES: CC(C)NCC(COC1=CC=CC=C1C2CCCCC2)O

Properties
| Chemical formula | C_{18}H_{29}NO_{2} |
| Molar mass | 291.435 g·mol^{−1} |
- Except where otherwise noted, data are given for materials in their standard state (at 25 °C [77 °F], 100 kPa). Infobox references

Exaprolol is a β-adrenoceptor antagonist.

== Synthesis ==
Exaprolol synthesis
