= Ericolol =

Chemical compound

Clinical data
- ATC code: None

Identifiers
- IUPAC name: 3-(4-Chloro-2-{2-hydroxy-3-[(2-methyl-2-propanyl)amino]propoxy}phenyl)-2-cyclopenten-1-one
- CAS Number: 85320-67-8
- PubChem CID: 208929
- ChemSpider: 181025
- UNII: 38R2P4PIEI
- ChEMBL: ChEMBL1742480
- CompTox Dashboard (EPA): DTXSID30868892

Chemical and physical data
- Formula: C_{18}H_{24}ClNO_{3}
- Molar mass: 337.84 g·mol^{−1}
- 3D model (JSmol): Interactive image
- SMILES: CC(C)(C)NCC(COC1=C(C=CC(=C1)Cl)C2=CC(=O)CC2)O
- InChI: InChI=1S/C18H24ClNO3/c1-18(2,3)20-10-15(22)11-23-17-9-13(19)5-7-16(17)12-4-6-14(21)8-12/h5,7-9,15,20,22H,4,6,10-11H2,1-3H3; Key:QACGCDWSRFDWQO-UHFFFAOYSA-N

Ericolol is a beta blocker.
