= Estrazinol =

Chemical compound

Clinical data
- Other names: 3-Methoxy-8-aza-19-norpregna-1,3,5(10)-trien-20-yn-17-ol; W-4454A

Identifiers
- IUPAC name: (1R,3aR,10bR,12aS)-1-ethynyl-8-methoxy-12a-methyl-1,2,3,3a,5,6,10b,11,12,12a-decahydrocyclopenta[5,6]pyrido[2,1-a]isoquinolin-1-ol
- CAS Number: 5941-36-6 15179-97-2 (HBr)
- PubChem CID: 10018368
- ChemSpider: 8193941
- UNII: 9KLU2E3573
- ChEMBL: ChEMBL2110830
- CompTox Dashboard (EPA): DTXSID10208136

Chemical and physical data
- Formula: C_{20}H_{25}NO_{2}
- Molar mass: 311.425 g·mol^{−1}
- 3D model (JSmol): Interactive image
- SMILES: CC12CCC3C4=C(CCN3C1CCC2(C#C)O)C=C(C=C4)OC
- InChI: InChI=1S/C20H25NO2/c1-4-20(22)11-8-18-19(20,2)10-7-17-16-6-5-15(23-3)13-14(16)9-12-21(17)18/h1,5-6,13,17-18,22H,7-12H2,2-3H3/t17-,18-,19+,20+/m1/s1; Key:NTHOJXSFNBUDMY-ZRNYENFQSA-N

Estrazinol (INN; also known as estrazinol hydrobromide (USAN), 3-methoxy-8-aza-19-norpregna-1,3,5(10)-trien-20-yn-17-ol, or development code W-4454A) is a synthetic, steroidal estrogen that was synthesized in 1968 and further characterized in 1973 but was never marketed. It is described as a water-soluble estrogen.
