= Elopiprazole =

Antipsychotic drug

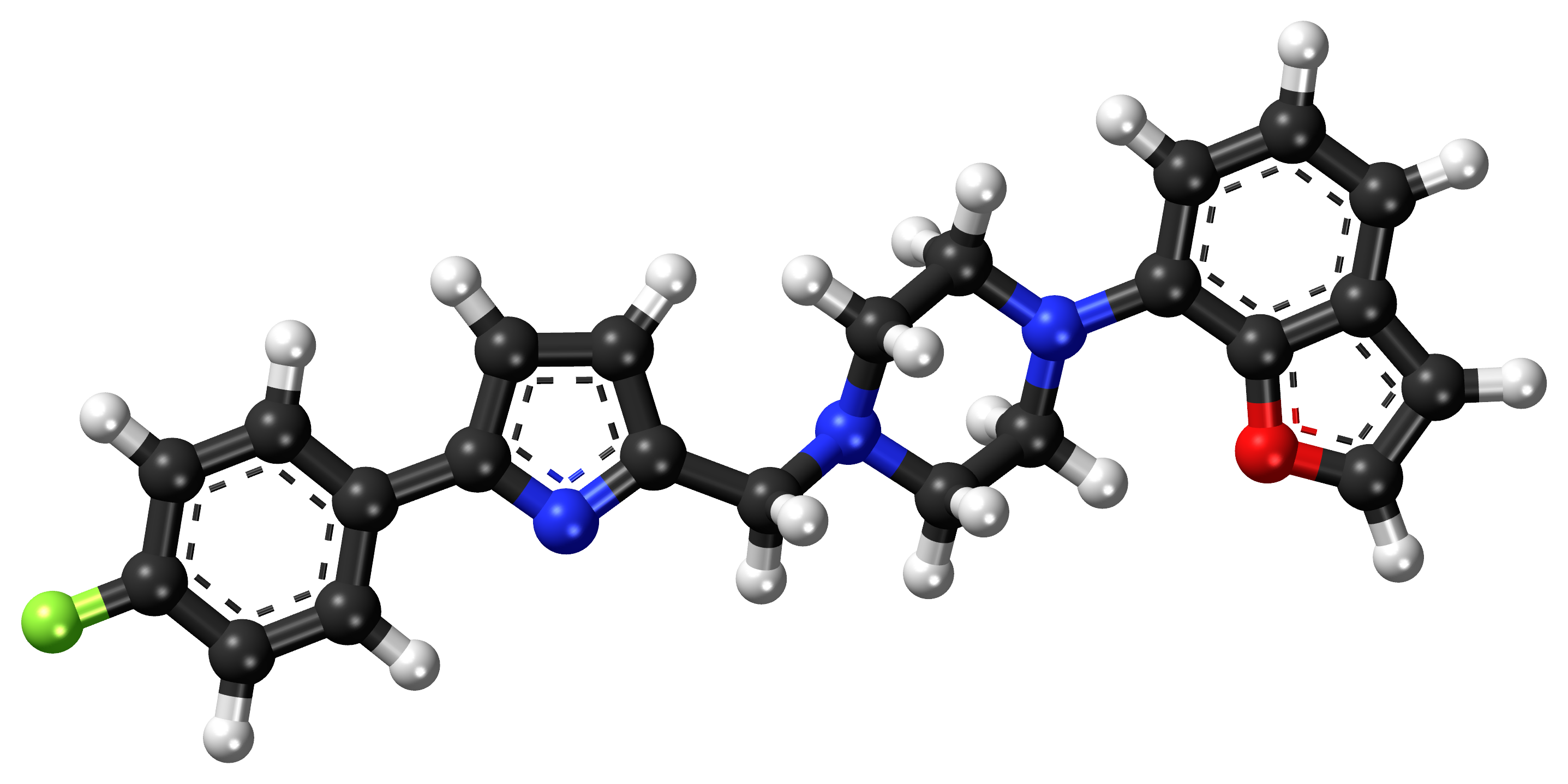

Clinical data
- Other names: DU-29840; DU29840; DU-29894; DU29894
- Routes of administration: Oral
- ATC code: None

Legal status
- Legal status: In general: uncontrolled

Pharmacokinetic data
- Elimination half-life: ≥30–40 hours

Identifiers
- IUPAC name: 1-(1-benzofuran-7-yl)-4-[[5-(4-fluorophenyl)-1H-pyrrol-2-yl]methyl]piperazine
- CAS Number: 115464-77-2
- PubChem CID: 208917
- DrugBank: DB19875
- ChemSpider: 181013
- UNII: 419A0R564U
- ChEMBL: ChEMBL292187
- CompTox Dashboard (EPA): DTXSID20151109

Chemical and physical data
- Formula: C_{23}H_{22}FN_{3}O
- Molar mass: 375.447 g·mol^{−1}
- 3D model (JSmol): Interactive image
- SMILES: Fc1ccc(cc1)c2ccc([nH]2)CN5CCN(c4cccc3c4occ3)CC5
- InChI: InChI=1S/C23H22FN3O/c24-19-6-4-17(5-7-19)21-9-8-20(25-21)16-26-11-13-27(14-12-26)22-3-1-2-18-10-15-28-23(18)22/h1-10,15,25H,11-14,16H2; Key:PGNHBJGIQAEIHD-UHFFFAOYSA-N

Elopiprazole (INN; developmental code names DU-29840 and DU-29894) is an experimental antipsychotic drug of the phenylpiperazine family which was under development for the treatment of psychotic disorders but was never marketed. It is taken orally. The drug acts as a dual dopamine D_{2} and D_{3} receptor antagonist and serotonin 5-HT_{1A} receptor agonist (K_{i} = 0.45 nM, 1.29 nM, and 1.45 nM, respectively). Conversely, it shows more than 50-fold lower affinity for the serotonin 5-HT_{2A} and 5-HT_{2C} receptors and various other targets. Elopiprazole was under development by Solvay Duphar. It reached phase 1 clinical trials for psychotic disorders prior to the discontinuation of its development.

== See also ==
- Phenylpiperazine
- List of investigational antipsychotics
