= Etozolin =

Chemical compound

Clinical data
- Trade names: Diulozin, Elkapin, Etopinil
- Other names: Etozoline
- Routes of administration: ?
- ATC code: C03CX01 (WHO)

Legal status
- Legal status: In general: ℞ (Prescription only)

Identifiers
- IUPAC name: Ethyl (2Z)-(3-methyl-4-oxo-5-piperidin-1-yl-1,3-thiazolidin-2-ylidene)ethanoate
- CAS Number: 73-09-6
- PubChem CID: 5743585
- DrugBank: DB08982
- ChemSpider: 4675409
- UNII: UEO8UW9V1Z
- CompTox Dashboard (EPA): DTXSID40874489
- ECHA InfoCard: 100.000.722

Chemical and physical data
- Formula: C_{13}H_{20}N_{2}O_{3}S
- Molar mass: 284.37 g·mol^{−1}
- 3D model (JSmol): Interactive image
- SMILES: CCOC(=O)/C=C1/N(C)C(=O)C(S1)N2CCCCC2

Etozolin (also known as Diulozin, Elkapin, or Etopinil) is a loop diuretic used in Europe. It is believed to be discontinued.

== See also ==
- Ozolinone
