= Emedastine =

Chemical compound

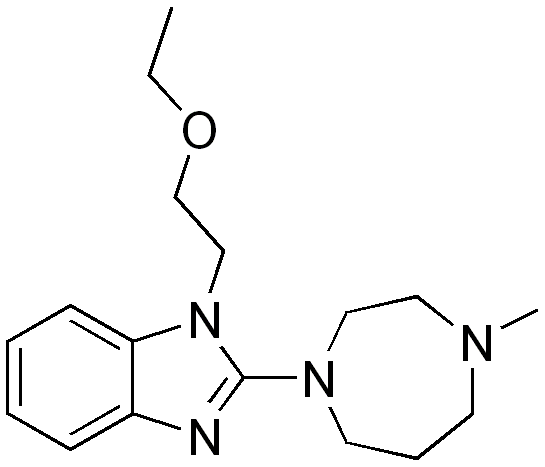

Identifiers
- IUPAC name: 1-(2-Ethoxyethyl)-2-(hexahydro-4-methyl-1H-1,4-diazepin-1-yl)-1H-benzimidazole
- CAS Number: 87233-61-2
- PubChem CID: 3219
- IUPHAR/BPS: 7174
- DrugBank: DB01084
- ChemSpider: 3106
- UNII: 9J1H7Y9OJV
- KEGG: D07890
- ChEBI: CHEBI:4779
- ChEMBL: ChEMBL594
- CompTox Dashboard (EPA): DTXSID7048243

Chemical and physical data
- Formula: C_{17} H_{26} N_{4} O
- 3D model (JSmol): Interactive image
- SMILES: CCOCCN1C2=CC=CC=C2N=C1N3CCCN(CC3)C
- InChI: InChI=1S/C17H26N4O/c1-3-22-14-13-21-16-8-5-4-7-15(16)18-17(21)20-10-6-9-19(2)11-12-20/h4-5,7-8H,3,6,9-14H2,1-2H3; Key:KBUZBQVCBVDWKX-UHFFFAOYSA-N

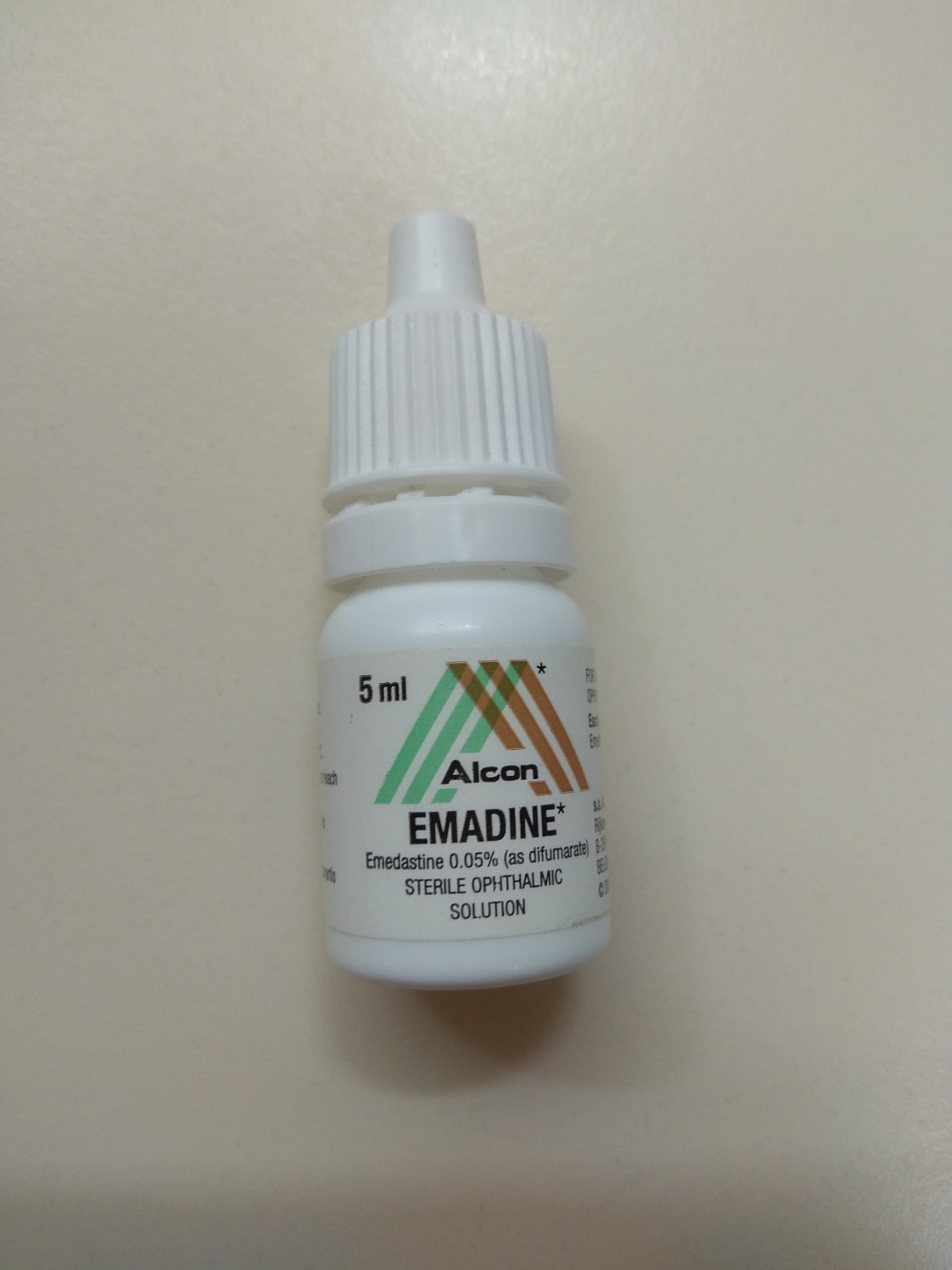
Eye drop of emedastine

Emedastine (trade name Emadine) is a second generation antihistamine used in eye drops to alleviate the symptoms of allergic conjunctivitis. It acts as a H_{1} receptor antagonist. It works by blocking the action of histamine that causes allergic symptoms. It is used in form of the difumarate. The emedastine difumarate is a white, crystalline, water-soluble fine powder. Emedastine eye drops is usually applied twice a day to the affected eye. When the patients with allergic conjunctivitis were treated with 0.05% emedastine difumarate ophthalmic solution for six weeks, the signs and symptoms such as redness, itching and swelling of the eyes were relieved. Emedastine appears to be devoid of effects on adrenergic, dopaminergic and serotonin receptors. This drug was developed by Alcon, which is global medical company specializing in eye care products.

== Pharmacodynamics ==
Emedastine is significantly selective to H_{1} histamine receptors (K_{i} = 1.3 nM), whereas its affinities for other histamine receptors were low (H_{2}: K_{i} = 49067 nM and H_{3}: K_{i} = 12430 nM) ub in vitro study. Topical ocular administration of emedastine inhibits histamine-stimulated vascular permeability in the conjunctiva as a concentration-dependent manner in in vitro study.

== Pharmacokinetics ==
The human oral bioavailability is approximately 50% and maximum plasma concentration was achieved within 1–2 hours after dosing. Emedastine is mainly metabolized by the liver. There are two primary metabolites: 5-hydroxyemedastine and 6-hydroxyemedastine. They are excreted in the urine as both free and conjugated forms. The 5'-oxoanalogs of 5-hydroxyemedastine, 6-hydroxyemedastine and the N-oxide are also formed as minor metabolites. The elimination half-life of oral emedastine in plasma is 3–4 hours, whereas that of topical emedastine is 10 hours. Approximately 44% of the oral dose is recovered in the urine over 24 hours with only 3.6% of the dose excreted as parent drug.

== Contraindications ==
Emedastine should not be used in patients who are hypersensitive to emedastine or any other excipients of the preparation. Benzalkonium chloride contained in the bottle of emedastine solution can discolor soft contact lenses, so people who wear contact lenses should be careful using it.

== Adverse events ==
The most common adverse effect was headache (11%). The other minor adverse effects encountered in less than 5% of patients were asthenia, burning or stinging sensation, unpleasant taste, blurred vision, eye dryness and tearing.
