= Enprofylline =

Chemical compound

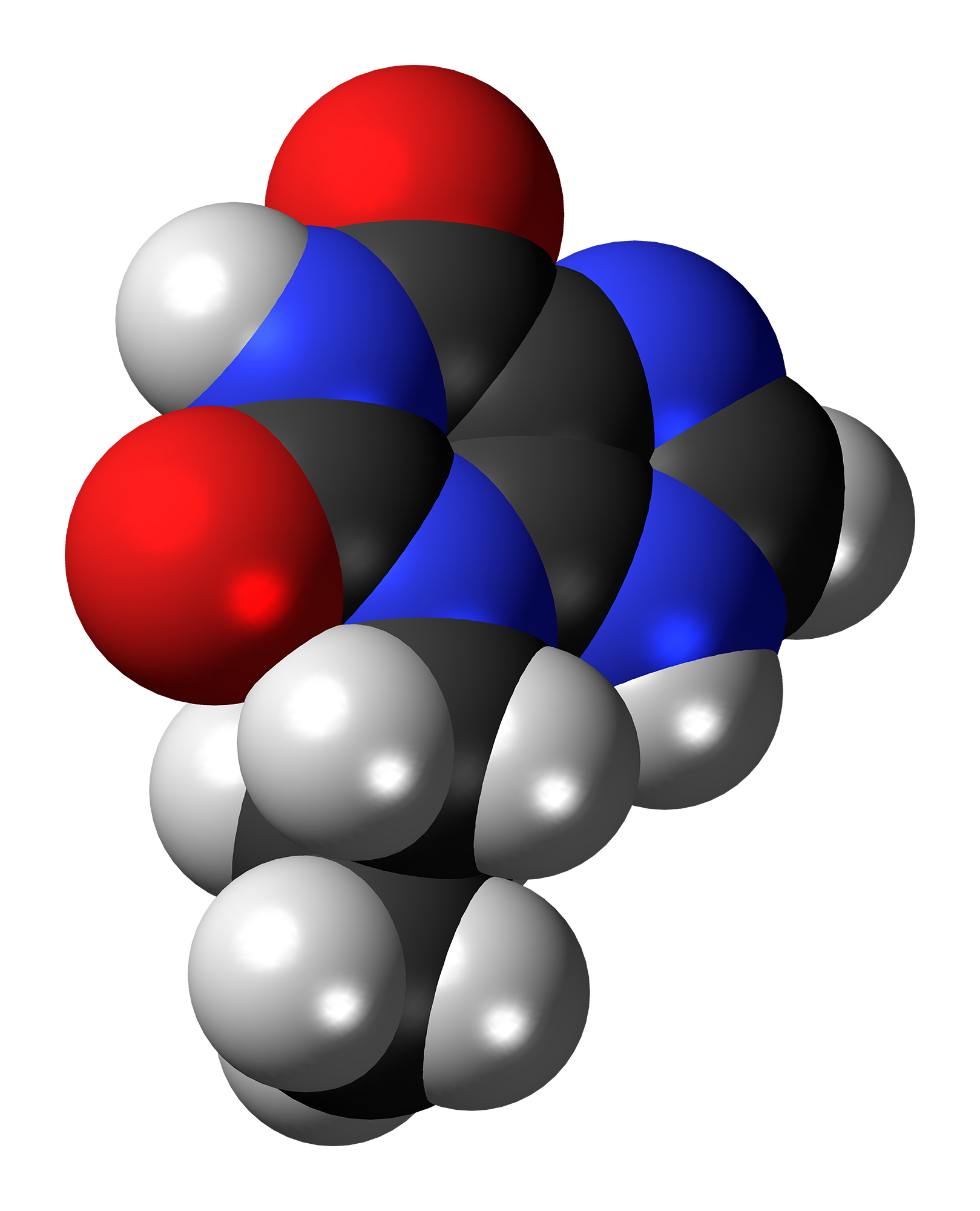

Clinical data
- ATC code: None

Identifiers
- IUPAC name: 3-Propyl-7H-purine-2,6-dione
- CAS Number: 41078-02-8
- PubChem CID: 1676
- DrugBank: DB00824
- ChemSpider: 1613
- UNII: DT7DT5E518
- KEGG: D04006
- ChEBI: CHEBI:126237
- ChEMBL: ChEMBL279898
- CompTox Dashboard (EPA): DTXSID9045186
- ECHA InfoCard: 100.050.166

Chemical and physical data
- Formula: C_{8}H_{10}N_{4}O_{2}
- Molar mass: 194.194 g·mol^{−1}
- 3D model (JSmol): Interactive image
- SMILES: CCCn2c(=O)[nH]c(=O)c1nc[nH]c12
- InChI: InChI=1S/C8H10N4O2/c1-2-3-12-6-5(9-4-10-6)7(13)11-8(12)14/h4H,2-3H2,1H3,(H,9,10)(H,11,13,14); Key:SIQPXVQCUCHWDI-UHFFFAOYSA-N

Enprofylline (3-propylxanthine) is a xanthine derivative used in the treatment of asthma, which acts as a bronchodilator. It acts primarily as a competitive nonselective phosphodiesterase inhibitor with relatively little activity as a nonselective adenosine receptor antagonist.
