= Edobacomab =

Monoclonal antibody

Monoclonal antibody
- Type: Whole antibody
- Source: Mouse
- Target: endotoxin

Clinical data
- Routes of administration: Intravenous infusion
- ATC code: none

Identifiers
- CAS Number: 141410-98-2
- ChemSpider: none
- UNII: 01L0MVY85E

Edobacomab, codenamed E5, is a mouse monoclonal antibody that was investigated as a possible treatment for sepsis caused by Gram-negative bacterial infections.
