= List of cardiac pharmaceutical agents =

The following are medications commonly prescribed cardiac pharmaceutical agents. The specificity of the following medications is highly variable, and often are not particularly specific to a given class. As such, they are listed as are commonly accepted.

== Antiarrhythmic agents ==
Group of pharmaceuticals that are used to suppress abnormally fast rhythms (tachycardias), such as atrial fibrillation, supraventricular tachycardia and ventricular tachycardia.

- Type I (sodium channel blockers)
  - Type Ia
    - Ajmaline
    - Procainamide
    - Quinidine
  - Type Ib
    - Lidocaine
    - Phenytoin
  - Type Ic
    - Encainide
    - Flecainide
    - Propafenone
- Type II (beta blockers)
  - Bisoprolol
  - Carvedilol
  - Metoprolol
  - Propranolol
- Type III (potassium channel blockers)
  - Amiodarone
  - Dofetilide
  - Sotalol
- Type IV (slow calcium channel blockers)
  - Diltiazem
  - Verapamil
- Type V
  - Adenosine
  - Digoxin

== ACE inhibitors ==
Class of antihypertensives that work by causing relaxation of blood vessels as well as a decrease in blood volume, which leads to lower blood pressure and decreased oxygen demand from the heart.

- Benazepril
- Captopril
- Enalapril
- Fosinopril
- Lisinopril
- Moexipril
- Perindopril
- Quinapril
- Ramipril
- Trandolapril

== Alpha blockers ==
- doxazosin
- chlorpromazine
- phentolamine
- indoramin
- phenoxybenzamine
- prazosin
- terazosin
- tolazoline
- urapidil

== Angiotensin II receptor antagonists ==
Class of antihypertensives that bind to and inhibit the angiotensin II receptor type 1 and thereby block the arteriolar contraction and sodium retention effects of renin–angiotensin system.

- Azilsartan medoxomil
- Candesartan
- Eprosartan
- Fimasartan
- Irbesartan
- Losartan
- Olmesartan
- Telmisartan
- Valsartan

== Beta blocker ==
Class of medications that are competitive antagonists that block the receptor sites for the endogenous catecholamines epinephrine (adrenaline) and norepinephrine (noradrenaline) on adrenergic beta receptors, of the sympathetic nervous system.

- Acebutolol
- Atenolol
- Betaxolol
- Bisoprolol
- Carteolol
- Carvedilol
- Esmolol
- Labetalol
- Metoprolol
- Nadolol
- Nebivolol
- Oxprenolol
- Penbutolol
- Pindolol
- Propranolol
- Sotalol
- Timolol

== Mixed alpha + beta blockers ==
- bucindolol
- carvedilol
- labetalol
- clonidine (indirectly)

== Calcium channel blockers ==
- dihydropyridines:
  - amlodipine
  - barnidipine
  - cilnidipine
  - clevidipine
  - felodipine
  - isradipine
  - lercanidipine
  - levamlodipine
  - nicardipine
  - nifedipine
  - nimodipine
  - nisoldipine
  - nitrendipine
- non-dihydropyridines
  - diltiazem
  - verapamil

== Antimineralocorticoid ==
- Eplerenone
- Finerenone
- Spironolactone

== Antiplatelet drug ==
- Abciximab
- Aspirin
- Cangrelor
- Clopidogrel
- Eptifibatide
- Prasugrel
- Ticagrelor
- Tirofiban

== Anticoagulant ==
- Apixaban
- Bivalirudin
- Dabigatran
- Edoxaban
- Enoxaparin
- Heparin
- Rivaroxaban
- Warfarin

== Fibrinolytics ==
- Alteplase
- Reteplase
- Streptokinase
- Tenecteplase
- Urokinase

== Diuretics ==
- Loop diuretics:
  - bumetanide
  - ethacrynic acid
  - furosemide
  - torsemide
- Thiazide diuretics:
  - epitizide
  - hydrochlorothiazide and chlorothiazide
  - bendroflumethiazide
  - methyclothiazide
  - polythiazide
- Thiazide-like diuretics:
  - indapamide
  - chlorthalidone
  - metolazone
  - Xipamide
  - Clopamide
- Potassium-sparing diuretics:
  - amiloride
  - triamterene
  - spironolactone
  - eplerenone
