= Antihypertensive =

Class of drugs used to treat high blood pressure

Antihypertensives are a class of medications that are used to treat hypertension (high blood pressure). Antihypertensive therapy seeks to prevent the complications of high blood pressure, such as stroke, heart failure, kidney failure and myocardial infarction. Evidence suggests that a reduction of blood pressure by 5 mmHg can decrease the risk of stroke by 34% and of ischaemic heart disease by 21%. It can reduce the likelihood of dementia, heart failure, and mortality from cardiovascular disease. There are many classes of antihypertensives, which lower blood pressure by different means. Among the most important and most widely used medications are thiazide diuretics, calcium channel blockers, angiotensin-converting enzyme inhibitors (ACE inhibitors), angiotensin II receptor blockers or antagonists (ARBs), and beta blockers.

Which type of medication to use initially for hypertension has been the subject of several large studies and resulting national guidelines. The fundamental goal of treatment should be the prevention of the important endpoints of hypertension, such as heart attack, stroke and heart failure. Patient age, associated clinical conditions and end-organ damage also play a part in determining dosage and type of medication administered. The several classes of antihypertensives differ in side effect profiles, ability to prevent endpoints, and cost. The choice of more expensive agents, where cheaper ones would be equally effective, may have negative impacts on national healthcare budgets. As of 2018, the best available evidence favors low-dose thiazide diuretics as the first-line treatment of choice for high blood pressure when drugs are necessary. Although clinical evidence shows calcium channel blockers and thiazide-type diuretics are preferred first-line treatments for most people (from both efficacy and cost points of view), an ACEi is recommended by NICE in the UK for those under 55 years old.

== Diuretics ==
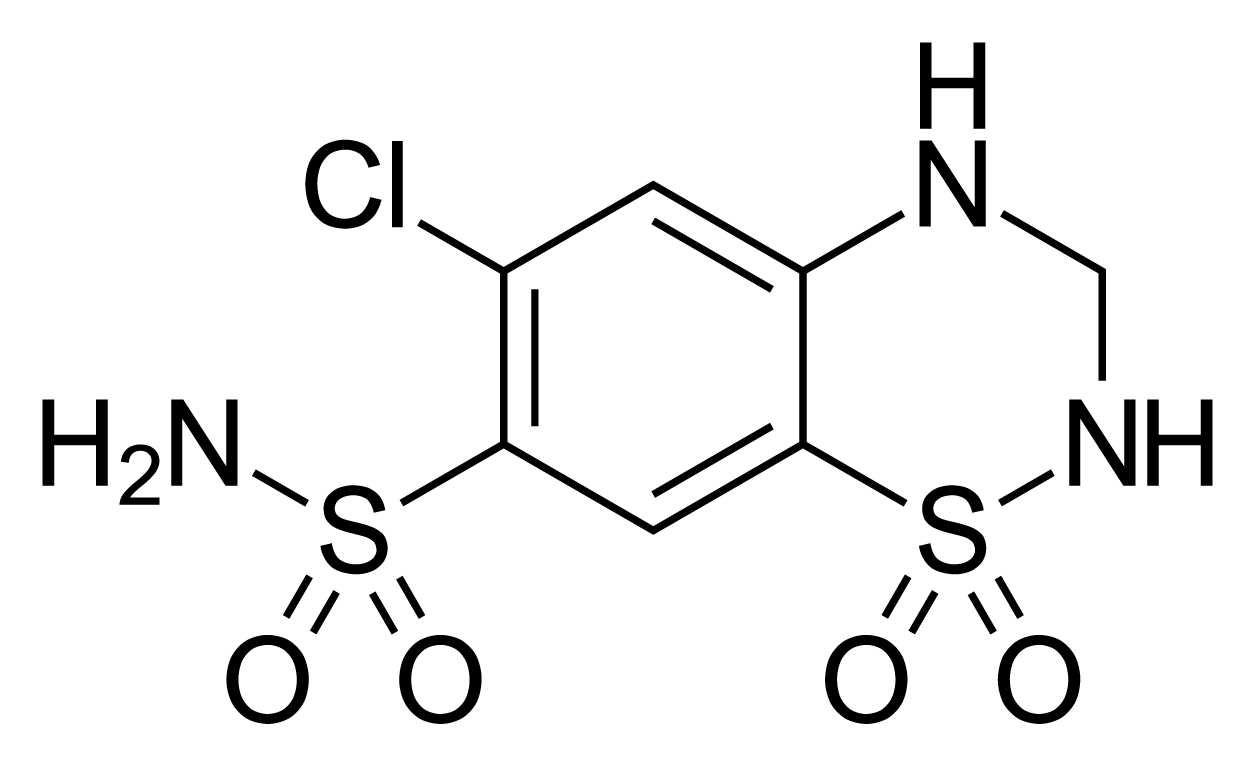
Hydrochlorothiazide, a popular thiazide diuretic

Diuretics help the kidneys eliminate excess salt and water from the body's tissues and blood.

- Loop diuretics:
  - bumetanide
  - ethacrynic acid
  - furosemide
  - torsemide
- Thiazide diuretics:
  - epitizide
  - hydrochlorothiazide and chlorothiazide
  - bendroflumethiazide
  - methyclothiazide
  - polythiazide
- Thiazide-like diuretics:
  - indapamide
  - chlorthalidone
  - metolazone
  - xipamide
  - clopamide
- Potassium-sparing diuretics:
  - amiloride
  - triamterene
  - spironolactone
  - eplerenone

In the United States, the JNC8 (Eighth Joint National Committee on the Prevention, Detection, Evaluation, and Treatment of High Blood Pressure) recommends thiazide-type diuretics to be one of the first-line drug treatments for hypertension, either as monotherapy or in combination with calcium channel blockers, ACEis, or ARBs. There are fixed-dose combination drugs, such as ACE inhibitor and thiazide combinations. Despite thiazides being cheap and effective, they are not prescribed as often as some newer drugs. This is because they have been associated with increased risk of new-onset diabetes and as such are recommended for use in patients over 65, for whom the risk of new-onset diabetes is outweighed by the benefits of controlling systolic blood pressure. Another theory is that they are off-patent and thus rarely promoted by the drug industry.

Medications that are classified as potassium-sparing diuretics which block the epithelial sodium channel (ENaC), such as amiloride and triamterene, are seldom prescribed as monotherapy. ENaC blocker medications need stronger public evidence for their blood pressure reducing effect.

== Calcium channel blockers ==
Calcium channel blockers block the entry of calcium into muscle cells in artery walls, resulting in the relaxation of muscle cells and vasodilation.

- dihydropyridines:
  - amlodipine
  - barnidipine
  - cilnidipine
  - clevidipine
  - felodipine
  - isradipine
  - lercanidipine
  - levamlodipine
  - nicardipine
  - nifedipine
  - nimodipine
  - nisoldipine
  - nitrendipine
- non-dihydropyridines:
  - diltiazem
  - verapamil

The 8th Joint National Committee (JNC-8) recommends calcium channel blockers to be a first-line treatment either as monotherapy or in combination with thiazide-type diuretics, ACEis, or ARBs for all patients regardless of age or race.

The ratio of CCBs' anti-proteinuria effect, non-dihydropyridine to dihydropyridine was 30 to −2. The anti-proteinuria effect of non-dihydropyridine is due to better selectivity during glomerular filtration and/or a lower perfusion rate through the renal system.

Notable side effects of CCBs include edema, flushing in the face, headache, drowsiness, and dizziness.

== ACEis ==
Captopril, the prototypical ACEi

ACEis inhibit the activity of angiotensin-converting enzyme (ACE), an enzyme responsible for the conversion of angiotensin I into angiotensin II, a potent vasoconstrictor.

- captopril
- enalapril
- fosinopril
- lisinopril
- moexipril
- perindopril
- quinapril
- ramipril
- trandolapril
- benazepril

A systematic review of 63 trials with over 35,000 participants indicated ACEis significantly reduced doubling of serum creatinine levels compared to other drugs (ARBs, α blockers, β blockers, etc.), and the authors suggested this as a first line of defense. The AASK trial showed that ACEis are more effective at slowing down the decline of kidney function compared to calcium channel blockers and beta blockers. As such, ACEis should be the drug treatment of choice for patients with chronic kidney disease regardless of race or diabetic status.

However, ACEis (and ARBs) should not be a first-line treatment for black hypertensives without chronic kidney disease. Results from the ALLHAT trial showed that thiazide-type diuretics and calcium channel blockers were both more effective as monotherapy in improving cardiovascular outcomes compared to ACEis for this subgroup. Furthermore, ACEis were less effective in reducing blood pressure and had a 51% higher risk of stroke in black hypertensives when used as initial therapy compared to a calcium channel blocker. There are fixed-dose combination drugs, such as ACE inhibitor and thiazide combinations.

Notable side effects of ACEis include dry cough, high blood levels of potassium, fatigue, dizziness, headaches, loss of taste and a risk for angioedema.

== ARBs ==
Valsartan, an ARB

ARBs work by antagonizing the activation of angiotensin receptors.

- azilsartan
- candesartan
- eprosartan
- irbesartan
- losartan
- olmesartan
- telmisartan
- valsartan
- fimasartan

In 2004, an article in the BMJ examined the evidence for and against the suggestion that ARBs may increase the risk of myocardial infarction (heart attack). The matter was debated in 2006 in the medical journal of the American Heart Association. There is no consensus on whether ARBs have a tendency to increase MI, but there is also no substantive evidence to indicate that ARBs are able to reduce MI.

In the VALUE trial, the ARB valsartan produced a statistically significant 19% (p=0.02) relative increase in the prespecified secondary end point of myocardial infarction (fatal and non-fatal) compared with amlodipine.

The CHARM-alternative trial showed a significant +52% (p=0.025) increase in myocardial infarction with candesartan (versus placebo) despite a reduction in blood pressure.

As a consequence of AT1 blockade, ARBs increase angiotensin II levels several-fold above baseline by uncoupling a negative-feedback loop. Increased levels of circulating angiotensin II result in unopposed stimulation of the AT2 receptors, which are, in addition upregulated. Recent data suggest that AT2 receptor stimulation may be less beneficial than previously proposed and may even be harmful under certain circumstances through mediation of growth promotion, fibrosis, and hypertrophy, as well as proatherogenic and proinflammatory effects.

An ARB happens to be the favorable alternative to an ACEi if a hypertensive patient with the heart-failure type of reduced ejection fraction treated with an ACEi (or ACEis) was intolerant of cough, angioedema other than hyperkalemia or chronic kidney disease.

== Adrenergic receptor antagonists ==
Propranolol, the first beta-blocker to be successfully developed

Beta-blockers can block beta-1 adrenergic receptors and/or beta-2 adrenergic receptors. Those that block beta-1-adrenergic receptors prevent the binding of endogenous catecholamines (such as epinephrine and norepinephrine), which ultimately reduces blood pressure through decreasing renin and cardiac output release. Those that block beta-2-adrenergic receptors reduce blood pressure through increased relaxation of smooth muscle.

Alpha-blockers can block alpha-1 adrenergic receptors and/or alpha-2 adrenergic receptors. Those that block alpha-1-adrenergic receptors on vascular smooth muscle cells prevent vasoconstriction. Blockade of alpha-2-adrenergic receptors prevents the negative feedback mechanism of norepinephrine (NE). Non-selective alpha-blockers generate a balance whereby alpha-2-blockers release NE to reduce the vasodilation effects induced by alpha-1-blockers.

- Beta blockers
  - acebutolol
  - atenolol
  - bisoprolol
  - betaxolol
  - carteolol
  - carvedilol
  - labetalol
  - metoprolol
  - nadolol
  - nebivolol
  - oxprenolol
  - penbutolol
  - pindolol
  - propranolol
  - timolol
- Alpha blockers:
  - doxazosin
  - chlorpromazine
  - phentolamine
  - indoramin
  - phenoxybenzamine
  - prazosin
  - terazosin
  - tolazoline
  - urapidil
- Mixed Alpha + Beta blockers:
  - bucindolol
  - carvedilol
  - labetalol
  - clonidine (indirectly)

Although beta blockers lower blood pressure, they do not have a positive benefit on endpoints as some other antihypertensives do. In particular, beta-blockers are no longer recommended as first-line treatment due to relative adverse risk of stroke and new-onset of type 2 diabetes when compared to other medications, while certain specific beta-blockers such as atenolol appear to be less useful in overall treatment of hypertension than several other agents. A systematic review of 63 trials with over 35,000 participants indicated β-blockers increased the risk of mortality, compared to other antihypertensive therapies. They do, however, have an important role in the prevention of heart attacks in people who have already had a heart attack. In the United Kingdom, the June 2006 "Hypertension: Management of Hypertension in Adults in Primary Care" guideline of the National Institute for Health and Clinical Excellence, downgraded the role of beta-blockers due to their risk of provoking type 2 diabetes.

Despite lowering blood pressure, alpha blockers have significantly poorer endpoint outcomes than other antihypertensives, and are no longer recommended as a first-line choice in the treatment of hypertension. However, they may be useful for some men with symptoms of prostate disease.

== Vasodilators ==
Vasodilators act directly on the smooth muscle of arteries to relax their walls so blood can move more easily through them; they are only used in hypertensive emergencies or when other drugs have failed, and even so are rarely given alone.

Sodium nitroprusside, a very potent, short-acting vasodilator, is most commonly used for the quick, temporary reduction of blood pressure in emergencies (such as malignant hypertension or aortic dissection). Hydralazine and its derivatives are also used in the treatment of severe hypertension, although they should be avoided in emergencies. They are no longer indicated as first-line therapy for high blood pressure due to side effects and safety concerns, but hydralazine remains a drug of choice in gestational hypertension.

== Renin inhibitors ==
Renin comes one level higher than ACE in the renin–angiotensin system. Renin inhibitors can therefore effectively reduce hypertension. Aliskiren (developed by Novartis) is a renin inhibitor which has been approved by the U.S. FDA for the treatment of hypertension.

== Aldosterone receptor antagonist ==
Aldosterone receptor antagonists, also known as mineralocorticoid receptor antagonist (MRA) can lower blood pressure by blocking the binding of aldosterone to the mineralocorticoid receptor. Spironolactone and eplerenone are MRAs that causes a block in the reabsorption of sodium, resulting in a decrease in blood pressure.

- eplerenone
- spironolactone

Aldosterone receptor antagonists are not recommended as first-line agents for blood pressure, but spironolactone and eplerenone are both used in the treatment of heart failure and resistant hypertension.

== Alpha-2 adrenergic receptor agonists ==
Central alpha agonists lower blood pressure by stimulating alpha-receptors in the brain which open peripheral arteries easing blood flow. These alpha 2 receptors are known as autoreceptors which provide negative feedback in neurotransmission (in this case, the vasoconstriction effects of adrenaline). Central alpha agonists, such as clonidine, are usually prescribed when all other anti-hypertensive medications have failed. For treating hypertension, these drugs are usually administered in combination with a diuretic.

- clonidine
- guanabenz
- guanfacine
- methyldopa
- moxonidine

Adverse effects of this class of drugs include sedation, drying of the nasal mucosa and rebound hypertension upon discontinuation.

Some indirect anti-adrenergics are rarely used in treatment-resistant hypertension:

- guanethidine – replaces norepinephrine in vesicles, decreasing its tonic release
- mecamylamine – antinicotinic and ganglion blocker
- reserpine – indirect via irreversible VMAT inhibition

== Endothelium receptor blockers ==
Bosentan belongs to a new class of drugs and works by blocking endothelin receptors. It is specifically indicated only for the treatment of pulmonary artery hypertension in patients with moderate to severe heart failure.

== Aldosterone synthase inhibitors ==
The aldosterone synthase inhibitor baxdrostat (Baxfendy) was approved for medical use in the United States in May 2026.

== Choice of initial medication ==
For mild blood pressure elevation, consensus guidelines call for medically supervised lifestyle changes and observation before recommending initiation of drug therapy. However, according to the American Hypertension Association, evidence of sustained damage to the body may be present even prior to observed elevation of blood pressure. Therefore, the use of hypertensive medications may be started in individuals with apparent normal blood pressures but who show evidence of hypertension-related nephropathy, proteinuria, atherosclerotic vascular disease, as well as other evidence of hypertension-related organ damage.

If lifestyle changes are ineffective, then drug therapy is initiated, often requiring more than one agent to effectively lower hypertension. Which type of many medications should be used initially for hypertension has been the subject of several large studies and various national guidelines. Considerations include factors such as age, race, and other medical conditions. In the United States, JNC8 (2014) recommends any drug from one of the four following classes to be a good choice as either initial therapy or as an add-on treatment: thiazide-type diuretics, calcium channel blockers, ACEis, or ARBs.

The first large study to show a mortality benefit from antihypertensive treatment was the VA-NHLBI study, which found that chlorthalidone was effective. The largest study, Antihypertensive and Lipid-Lowering Treatment to Prevent Heart Attack Trial (ALLHAT) in 2002, concluded that chlorthalidone (a thiazide-like diuretic) was as effective as lisinopril (an ACEi) or amlodipine (a calcium channel blocker). (ALLHAT showed that doxazosin, an alpha-adrenergic receptor blocker, had a higher incidence of heart failure events, and the doxazosin arm of the study was stopped.)

A subsequent smaller study (ANBP2) did not show the slight advantages in thiazide diuretic outcomes observed in the ALLHAT study, and actually showed slightly better outcomes for ACEis in older white male patients.

Thiazide diuretics are effective, recommended as the best first-line drug for hypertension, and are much more affordable than other therapies, yet they are not prescribed as often as some newer drugs. Chlorthalidone is the thiazide drug that is most strongly supported by the evidence as providing a mortality benefit; in the ALLHAT study, a chlorthalidone dose of 12.5 mg was used, with titration up to 25 mg for those subjects who did not achieve blood pressure control at 12.5 mg. Chlorthalidone has repeatedly been found to have a stronger effect on lowering blood pressure than hydrochlorothiazide, and hydrochlorothiazide and chlorthalidone have a similar risk of hypokalemia and other adverse effects at the usual doses prescribed in routine clinical practice. Patients with an exaggerated hypokalemic response to a low dose of a thiazide diuretic should be suspected to have hyperaldosteronism, a common cause of secondary hypertension.

Other medications have a role in treating hypertension. Adverse effects of thiazide diuretics include hypercholesterolemia, and impaired glucose tolerance with increased risk of developing diabetes mellitus type 2. The thiazide diuretics also deplete circulating potassium unless combined with a potassium-sparing diuretic or supplemental potassium. Some authors have challenged thiazides as first line treatment. However, as the Merck Manual of Geriatrics notes, "thiazide-type diuretics are especially safe and effective in the elderly."

Guidelines in the United Kingdom suggest starting people aged 55 years of age and older and all those of African/Afrocaribbean ethnicity first on calcium channel blockers or thiazide diuretics, while younger people of other ethnic groups should be started on ACEis. Subsequently, if dual therapy is required to use an ACEi in combination with either a calcium channel blocker or a (thiazide) diuretic. Triple therapy is then of all three groups and should the need arise then to add in a fourth agent, to consider either a further diuretic (e.g. spironolactone or furosemide), an alpha-blocker or a beta-blocker. Prior to the demotion of beta-blockers as first line agents, the UK sequence of combination therapy used the first letter of the drug classes and was known as the "ABCD rule".

=== Patient factors ===
The choice between the drugs is to a large degree determined by the characteristics of the person being prescribed for, the drugs' side effects, and cost. Most drugs have other uses; sometimes the presence of other symptoms can warrant the use of one particular antihypertensive. Examples include:

- Age can affect the choice of medications. UK guidelines suggest starting patients over the age of 55 years first on calcium channel blockers or thiazide diuretics.
- Age and multi-morbidity can affect the choice of medication, the target blood pressure and even whether to treat or not.
- Anxiety may be improved with the use of beta blockers.
- Asthmatics have been reported to have worsening symptoms when using beta blockers.
- Beta blockers can trigger or worsen psoriasis, psoriatic arthritis, and rheumatoid arthritis.
- Benign prostatic hyperplasia may be improved with the use of an alpha blocker.
- Chronic kidney disease. ACEis or ARBs should be included in the treatment plan to improve kidney outcomes regardless of race or diabetic status.
- Late-stage dementia should consider deprescribing antihypertensives, according to the Medication Appropriateness Tool for Comorbid Health Conditions in Dementia (MATCH-D).
- Diabetes mellitus. The ACEis and ARBs have been shown to prevent the kidney and retinal complications of diabetes mellitus.
- Gout may be worsened by thiazide diuretics, while losartan reduces serum urate.
- Kidney stones may be improved with the use of thiazide-type diuretics
- Heart block. β-blockers and nondihydropyridine calcium channel blockers should not be used in patients with heart block greater than first degree. JNC8 does not recommend β-blockers as initial therapy for hypertension.
- Heart failure may be worsened with nondihydropyridine calcium channel blockers, the alpha blocker doxazosin, and the alpha-2 agonists moxonidine and clonidine. On the other hand, β-blockers, diuretics, ACEis, ARBs, and aldosterone receptor antagonists have been shown to improve outcome.
- Pregnancy. Although α-methyldopa is generally regarded as a first-line agent, labetalol and metoprolol are also acceptable. Atenolol has been associated with intrauterine growth retardation, as well as decreased placental growth and weight when prescribed during pregnancy. ACEis and ARBs are contraindicated in women who are or who intend to become pregnant.
- Periodontal disease could mitigate the efficacy of antihypertensive drugs.
- Race. JNC8 guidelines particularly point out that when used as monotherapy, thiazide diuretics, and calcium channel blockers have been found to be more effective in reducing blood pressure in black hypertensives than β-blockers, ACEis, or ARBs.
- Tremor may warrant the use of beta blockers.

The JNC8 guidelines indicate reasons to choose one drug over the others for certain individual patients.

== Antihypertensive medication during the first trimester of pregnancy ==
Hypertensive disorders during pregnancy constitute a significant risk factor for maternal and fetal outcomes, necessitating antihypertensive treatment. However, data concerning the safety of in utero exposure to antihypertensive medication are controversial. While some studies recommend the administration of certain agents, others underline the possible adverse effects on fetal development. In general, a-methyldopa, β-blockers and calcium channel blockers are the first or second treatment line for hypertension during pregnancy. However, ACEis, ARBs and diuretics are mostly contraindicated, as the potential risk outweighs the benefits of their administration. Additionally, several drugs should be avoided, due to the lack of data regarding their safety. Shared decision-making aids have been shown to reduce women's uncertainty about taking antihypertensives and increase the number of women taking them as prescribed.

== History ==
=== History of thiazides ===
Chlorothiazide was discovered in 1957, but the first known instance of an effective antihypertensive treatment was in 1947 using primaquine, an antimalarial.

=== History of calcium channel blockers ===
In 1883, Ringer discovered the involvement of calcium for cellular activity on isolated heart. Later in 1901, Stiles reported the same activity in muscle contraction. In the early 1940s, Kamada (from Japan) and Heilbrunn (from the United States) noted how calcium was involved with muscle contractions. In 1964, calcium channel blockers were discovered in Godfraind's laboratory through the screening of coronary dilators, which showed how calcium was blocked from entering artery cells, resulting in vasorelaxation.

== Research ==
=== Blood pressure vaccines ===
Vaccinations are being trialed and may become a treatment option for high blood pressure in the future. CYT006-AngQb was only moderately successful in studies, but similar vaccines are being investigated.

=== Anti-hypertensive drugs in older people ===
There isn't sufficient evidence of an effect due to discontinuing vs continuing medications used for treating elevated blood pressure or prevention of heart disease in older adults on all-case mortality and incidence of heart attack. The findings are based on low-quality evidence suggesting it may be safe to stop anti-hypertensive medications.
