= Fenquizone =

Chemical compound

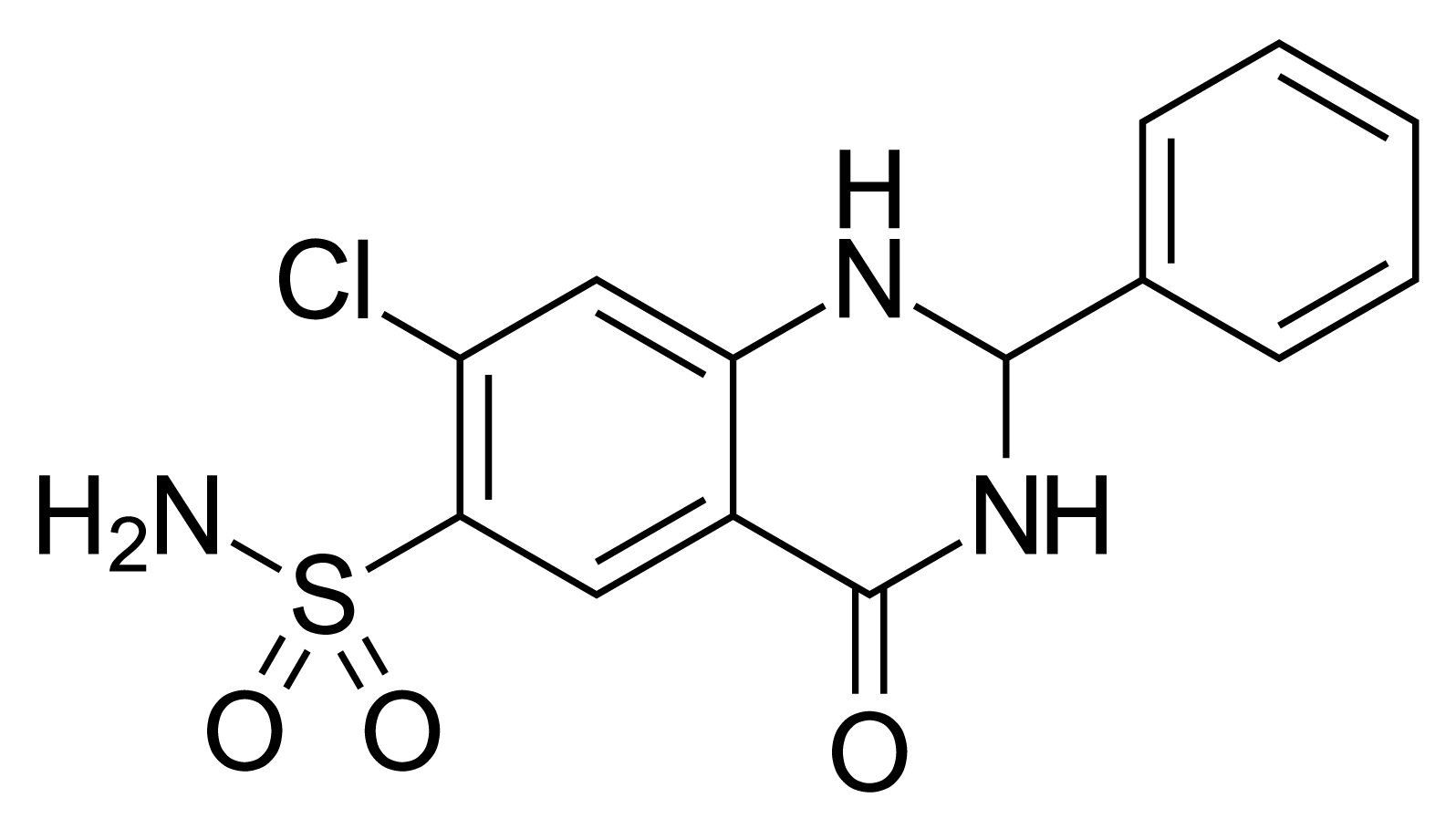

Clinical data
- ATC code: C03BA13 (WHO)

Identifiers
- IUPAC name: 7-chloro-4-oxo-2-phenyl-1,2,3,4-tetrahydroquinazoline-6-sulfonamide
- CAS Number: 20287-37-0
- PubChem CID: 68548
- ChemSpider: 61822
- UNII: LJ1U13R8IK
- KEGG: D04161
- CompTox Dashboard (EPA): DTXSID10864933
- ECHA InfoCard: 100.039.702

Chemical and physical data
- Formula: C_{14}H_{12}ClN_{3}O_{3}S
- Molar mass: 337.78 g·mol^{−1}
- 3D model (JSmol): Interactive image
- SMILES: O=S(=O)(c3c(Cl)cc2c(C(=O)NC(c1ccccc1)N2)c3)N
- InChI: InChI=1S/C14H12ClN3O3S/c15-10-7-11-9(6-12(10)22(16,20)21)14(19)18-13(17-11)8-4-2-1-3-5-8/h1-7,13,17H,(H,18,19)(H2,16,20,21); Key:DBDTUXMDTSTPQZ-UHFFFAOYSA-N

Fenquizone (INN) is a diuretic, part of the class of low-ceiling sulfonamide diuretics. Fenquizone is used primarily in the treatment of oedema and hypertension.

== See also ==
- Quinethazone
- Metolazone
