= Cyclopenthiazide =

Chemical compound

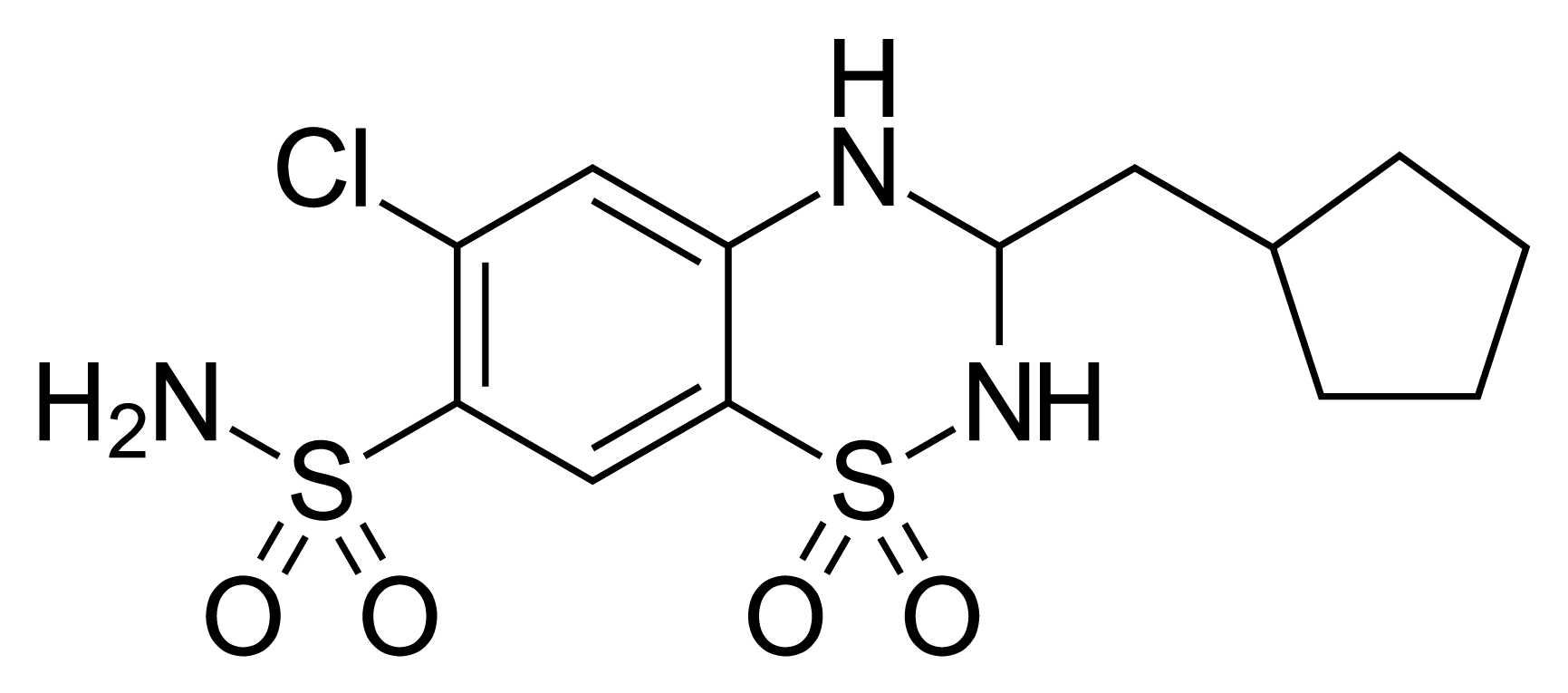

Clinical data
- AHFS/Drugs.com: International Drug Names
- ATC code: C03AA07 (WHO)

Legal status
- Legal status: UK: POM (Prescription only)

Identifiers
- IUPAC name: 6-chloro-3-(cyclopentylmethyl)-1,1-dioxo-3,4-dihydro-2H-benzo[e][1,2,4]thiadiazine-7-sulfonamide
- CAS Number: 742-20-1
- PubChem CID: 2904
- IUPHAR/BPS: 7899
- ChemSpider: 2801
- UNII: VX4S2N85F5
- KEGG: D02061
- ChEMBL: ChEMBL1373254
- CompTox Dashboard (EPA): DTXSID4022868
- ECHA InfoCard: 100.010.920

Chemical and physical data
- Formula: C_{13}H_{18}ClN_{3}O_{4}S_{2}
- Molar mass: 379.87 g·mol^{−1}
- 3D model (JSmol): Interactive image
- SMILES: O=S(=O)(c1c(Cl)cc2c(c1)S(=O)(=O)NC(N2)CC3CCCC3)N
- InChI: InChI=1S/C13H18ClN3O4S2/c14-9-6-10-12(7-11(9)22(15,18)19)23(20,21)17-13(16-10)5-8-3-1-2-4-8/h6-8,13,16-17H,1-5H2,(H2,15,18,19); Key:BKYKPTRYDKTTJY-UHFFFAOYSA-N

Cyclopenthiazide (trade name Navidrex) is a thiazide diuretic used in the treatment of heart failure and hypertension.

== Synthesis ==
Cyclopenthiazide synthesis:

== Contraindications ==
Thiazide diuretics increase the excretion of sodium and potassium ions and decrease the excretion of calcium ions and uric acid so they are contraindicated in patients with hyponatraemia, hypokalaemia, hypercalcaemia and hyperuricaemia. They are also contraindicated in patients with Addison's disease.

== See also ==
- Cyclothiazide
- Hydrochlorothiazide
- Bendroflumethiazide
