= C16H16ClN3O3S =

The molecular formula C_{16}H_{16}ClN_{3}O_{3}S (molar mass: 365.83 g/mol, exact mass: 365.0601 u) may refer to:

- Indapamide
- Metolazone
