= C14H12ClNO2 =

The molecular formula C_{14}H_{12}ClNO_{2} (molar mass : 261.70 g/mol) may refer to:

- Cicletanine, a furopyridine low-ceiling diuretic drug, usually used in the treatment of hypertension
- Tolfenamic acid, a nonsteroidal anti-inflammatory drug used to treat the symptoms of migraine
