= Hydroflumethiazide =

Chemical compound

Clinical data
- AHFS/Drugs.com: Micromedex Detailed Consumer Information
- ATC code: C03AA02 (WHO)

Identifiers
- IUPAC name: 1,1-Dioxo-6-(trifluoromethyl)-3,4-dihydro-2H-1,2,4-benzothiadiazine-7-sulfonamide
- CAS Number: 135-09-1
- PubChem CID: 3647
- IUPHAR/BPS: 7197
- DrugBank: DB00774
- ChemSpider: 3521
- UNII: 501CFL162R
- KEGG: D00654
- ChEMBL: ChEMBL1763
- CompTox Dashboard (EPA): DTXSID3023132
- ECHA InfoCard: 100.004.704

Chemical and physical data
- Formula: C_{8}H_{8}F_{3}N_{3}O_{4}S_{2}
- Molar mass: 331.28 g·mol^{−1}
- 3D model (JSmol): Interactive image
- SMILES: FC(F)(F)c2c(cc1c(NCNS1(=O)=O)c2)S(=O)(=O)N
- InChI: InChI=1S/C8H8F3N3O4S2/c9-8(10,11)4-1-5-7(2-6(4)19(12,15)16)20(17,18)14-3-13-5/h1-2,13-14H,3H2,(H2,12,15,16); Key:DMDGGSIALPNSEE-UHFFFAOYSA-N

Hydroflumethiazide (or Saluron) is a diuretic.

== Synthesis ==
Hydroflumethiazide synthesis: Numerous patents, e.g., Lund et al., U.S. patent 3,254,076 (1966 to Lövens Kemiske Fabrik).

== See also ==
- Bendroflumethiazide
