= C15H21NO3 =

The molecular formula C_{15}H_{21}NO_{3} (molar mass: 263.332 g/mol, exact mass: 263.1521 u) may refer to:

- Hydroxypethidine (Bemidone)
- Metostilenol
- N-Ethylhexylone
