= Butizide =

Chemical compound

Clinical data
- Other names: thiabutazide, buthiazide
- ATC code: C03EA14 (WHO) (combination with potassium-sparing diuretics)

Pharmacokinetic data
- Bioavailability: 85%
- Protein binding: 60–80%
- Metabolism: hepatic
- Elimination half-life: 4 hours
- Excretion: 30% unchanged with the urine

Identifiers
- CAS Number: 2043-38-1
- PubChem CID: 16274
- ChemSpider: 15442
- UNII: W00SSD35VW
- KEGG: D03189
- CompTox Dashboard (EPA): DTXSID6022713
- ECHA InfoCard: 100.016.409

Chemical and physical data
- Formula: C_{11}H_{16}ClN_{3}O_{4}S_{2}
- Molar mass: 353.84 g·mol^{−1}
- 3D model (JSmol): Interactive image
- SMILES: CC(C)CC1NC2=CC(=C(C=C2S(=O)(=O)N1)S(=O)(=O)N)Cl
- InChI: InChI=1S/C11H16ClN3O4S2/c1-6(2)3-11-14-8-4-7(12)9(20(13,16)17)5-10(8)21(18,19)15-11/h4-6,11,14-15H,3H2,1-2H3,(H2,13,16,17); Key:HGBFRHCDYZJRAO-UHFFFAOYSA-N

Butizide (or thiabutazide) is a diuretic of the thiazide class.

== Medical uses ==
Butizide is used in combination with the potassium-sparing diuretic spironolactone for the second-line treatment of edema caused by heart failure, and for difficult cases of hypertension.

== Interactions ==
The hypotensive effects of butizide can be increased by antihypertensive drugs (especially ACE inhibitors), barbiturates, tricyclic antidepressants, and ethanol. Combination with beta blockers can increase blood glucose levels; and conversely, butizide can decrease the effects of antidiabetic drugs. As butizide lowers blood potassium and magnesium levels, it can increase the effects of cardiac glycosides. It can also increase lithium toxicity.

Nonsteroidal anti-inflammatory drugs can decrease the diuretic effect of butizide.

== Pharmacology ==
=== Pharmacokinetics ===
Butizide is quickly absorbed from the gut with a bioavailability of 85%. It reaches highest blood plasma concentrations after 2.5 hours. Plasma protein binding is 60 to 80%. While the substance is metabolised in the liver, 30% are excreted in unchanged from with the urine. Elimination half-life is about four hours.

== Chemistry ==
=== Synthesis ===
Thiabutazide synthesis
