= C12H19NO3 =

The molecular formula C_{12}H_{19}NO_{3} (molar mass : 225.28 g/mol, exact mass : 225.136493) may refer to:

- BOD (psychedelic)
- Colterol
- Escaline
- 2-Methylmescaline
- Macromerine
- Metaescaline
- N-Hydroxy-DOM
- N-Methylmescaline
- Metiprenaline
- Prenalterol
- Terbutaline
- Trimethoxyamphetamines
  - 2,4,5-Trimethoxyamphetamine
  - 3,4,5-Trimethoxyamphetamine
