= Centyl =

Centyl may refer to:

- Centyl, a brand name of the drug bendroflumethiazide
- Centyl (EP), a 2025 EP by Naykilla
