= C13H15NO2 =

The molecular formula C_{13}H_{15}NO_{2} (molar mass: 217.26 g/mol, exact mass: 217.1103 u) may refer to:

- Glutethimide
- Methastyridone
- Methylenedioxypropargylamphetamine (MDPL)
- Securinine
