= ATC code C03 =

ATC code C03 Diuretics is a therapeutic subgroup of the Anatomical Therapeutic Chemical Classification System, a system of alphanumeric codes developed by the World Health Organization (WHO) for the classification of drugs and other medical products. Subgroup C03 is part of the anatomical group C Cardiovascular system.

Codes for veterinary use (ATCvet codes) can be created by placing the letter Q in front of the human ATC code: for example, QC03. ATCvet codes without corresponding human ATC codes are cited with the leading Q in the following list.
National versions of the ATC classification may include additional codes not present in this list, which follows the WHO version.

== C03A Low-ceiling diuretics, thiazides ==
=== C03AA Thiazides, plain ===
C03AA01 Bendroflumethiazide
C03AA02 Hydroflumethiazide
C03AA03 Hydrochlorothiazide
C03AA04 Chlorothiazide
C03AA05 Polythiazide
C03AA06 Trichlormethiazide
C03AA07 Cyclopenthiazide
C03AA08 Methyclothiazide
C03AA09 Cyclothiazide
C03AA13 Mebutizide
QC03AA56 Trichlormethiazide, combinations

=== C03AB Thiazides and potassium in combination ===
C03AB01 Bendroflumethiazide and potassium
C03AB02 Hydroflumethiazide and potassium
C03AB03 Hydrochlorothiazide and potassium
C03AB04 Chlorothiazide and potassium
C03AB05 Polythiazide and potassium
C03AB06 Trichlormethiazide and potassium
C03AB07 Cyclopenthiazide and potassium
C03AB08 Methyclothiazide and potassium
C03AB09 Cyclothiazide and potassium

=== C03AH Thiazides, combinations with psycholeptics and/or analgesics ===
C03AH01 Chlorothiazide, combinations
C03AH02 Hydroflumethiazide, combinations

=== C03AX Thiazides, combinations with other drugs ===
C03AX01 Hydrochlorothiazide, combinations

== C03B Low-ceiling diuretics, excluding thiazides ==
=== C03BA Sulfonamides, plain ===
C03BA02 Quinethazone
C03BA03 Clopamide
C03BA04 Chlortalidone
C03BA05 Mefruside
C03BA07 Clofenamide
C03BA08 Metolazone
C03BA09 Meticrane
C03BA10 Xipamide
C03BA11 Indapamide
C03BA12 Clorexolone
C03BA13 Fenquizone
C03BA82 Clorexolone, combinations with psycholeptics

=== C03BB Sulfonamides and potassium in combination ===
C03BB02 Quinethazone and potassium
C03BB03 Clopamide and potassium
C03BB04 Chlortalidone and potassium
C03BB05 Mefruside and potassium
C03BB07 Clofenamide and potassium

=== C03BC Mercurial diuretics ===
C03BC01 Mersalyl

=== C03BD Xanthine derivatives ===
C03BD01 Theobromine

=== C03BX Other low-ceiling diuretics ===
C03BX03 Cicletanine

== C03C High-ceiling diuretics ==
=== C03CA Sulfonamides, plain ===
C03CA01 Furosemide
C03CA02 Bumetanide
C03CA03 Piretanide
C03CA04 Torasemide

=== C03CB Sulfonamides and potassium in combination ===
C03CB01 Furosemide and potassium
C03CB02 Bumetanide and potassium

=== C03CC Aryloxyacetic acid derivatives ===
C03CC01 Etacrynic acid
C03CC02 Tienilic acid

=== C03CD Pyrazolone derivatives ===
C03CD01 Muzolimine

=== C03CX Other high-ceiling diuretics ===
C03CX01 Etozolin

== C03D Aldosterone antagonists and other potassium-sparing agents ==
=== C03DA Aldosterone antagonists ===
C03DA01 Spironolactone
C03DA02 Potassium canrenoate
C03DA03 Canrenone
C03DA04 Eplerenone
C03DA05 Finerenone
C03DA54 Eplerenone and dapagliflozin

=== C03DB Other potassium-sparing agents ===
C03DB01 Amiloride
C03DB02 Triamterene

== C03E Diuretics and potassium-sparing agents in combination ==
=== C03EA Low-ceiling diuretics and potassium-sparing agents ===
C03EA01 Hydrochlorothiazide and potassium-sparing agents
C03EA02 Trichlormethiazide and potassium-sparing agents
C03EA03 Epitizide and potassium-sparing agents
C03EA04 Altizide and potassium-sparing agents
C03EA05 Mebutizide and potassium-sparing agents
C03EA06 Chlortalidone and potassium-sparing agents
C03EA07 Cyclopenthiazide and potassium-sparing agents
C03EA12 Metolazone and potassium-sparing agents
C03EA13 Bendroflumethiazide and potassium-sparing agents
C03EA14 Butizide and potassium-sparing agents

=== C03EB High-ceiling diuretics and potassium-sparing agents ===
C03EB01 Furosemide and potassium-sparing agents
C03EB02 Bumetanide and potassium-sparing agents
C03EB03 Torasemide and potassium-sparing agents

== C03X Other diuretics ==
=== C03XA Vasopressin receptor antagonist|Vasopressin antagonists ===
C03XA01 Tolvaptan
C03XA02 Conivaptan
