= Clofenamide =

Chemical compound

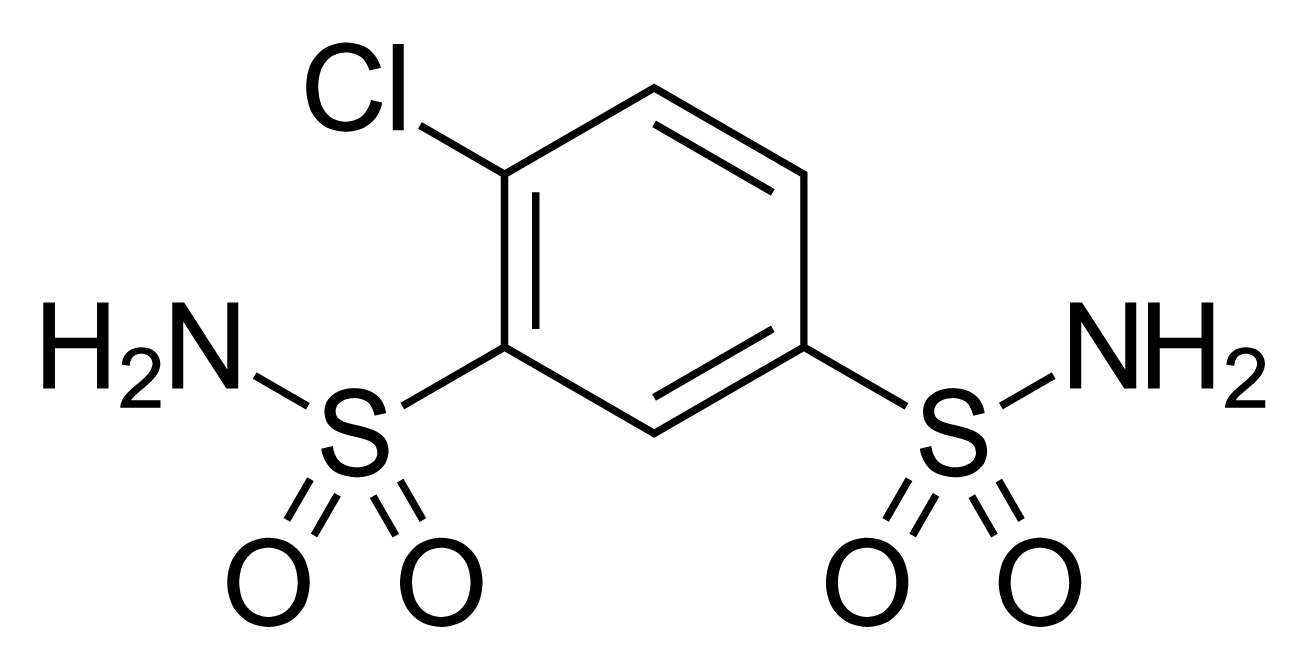

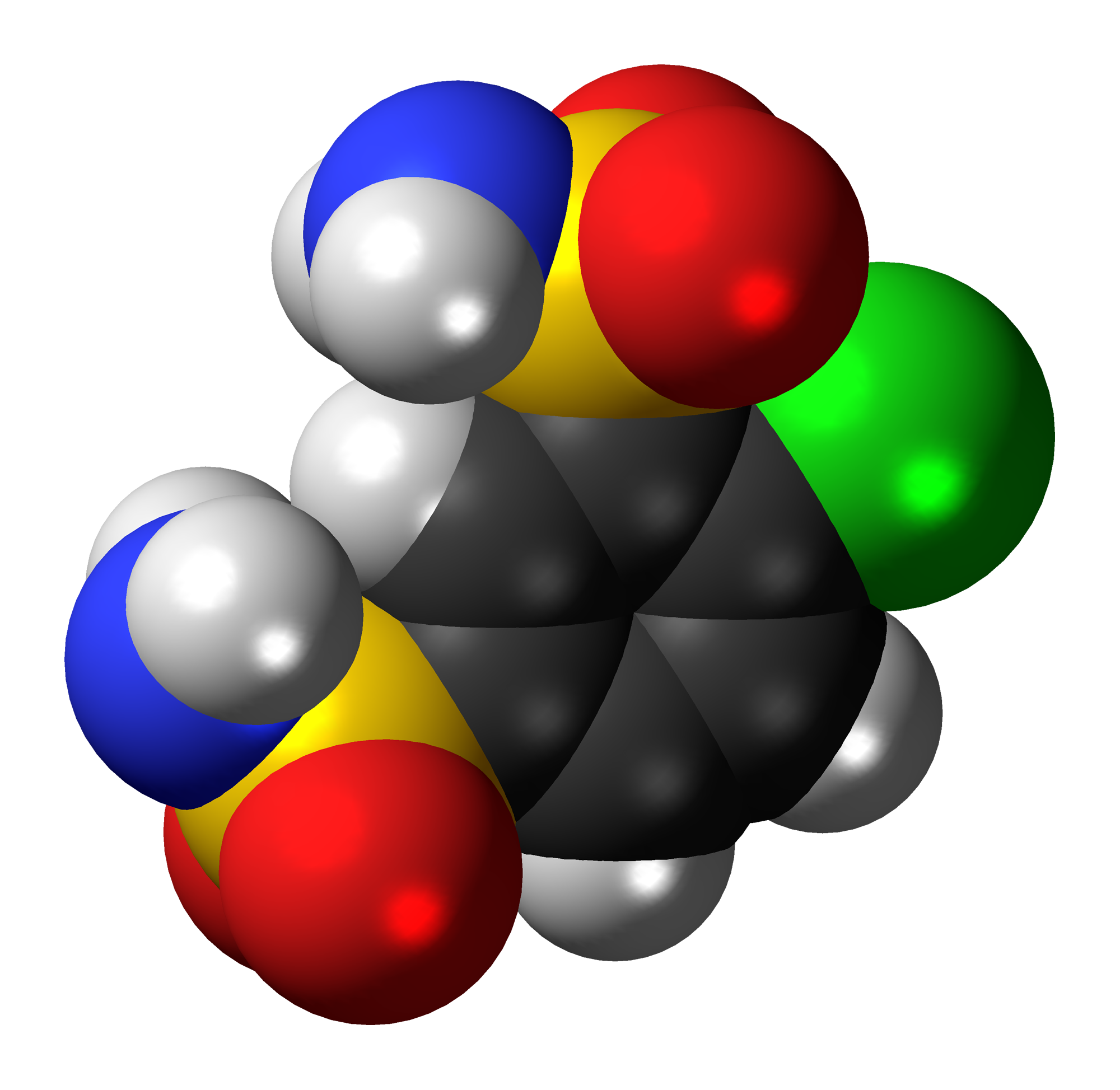

Clinical data
- ATC code: C03BA07 (WHO)

Identifiers
- IUPAC name: 4-chlorobenzene-1,3-disulfonamide
- CAS Number: 671-95-4
- PubChem CID: 69594
- ChemSpider: 62797
- UNII: 582ILN204B
- KEGG: D01822
- ChEMBL: ChEMBL1865258
- CompTox Dashboard (EPA): DTXSID4046153
- ECHA InfoCard: 100.010.536

Chemical and physical data
- Formula: C_{6}H_{7}ClN_{2}O_{4}S_{2}
- Molar mass: 270.70 g·mol^{−1}
- 3D model (JSmol): Interactive image
- SMILES: O=S(=O)(c1cc(ccc1Cl)S(=O)(=O)N)N
- InChI: InChI=1S/C6H7ClN2O4S2/c7-5-2-1-4(14(8,10)11)3-6(5)15(9,12)13/h1-3H,(H2,8,10,11)(H2,9,12,13); Key:NENBAISIHCWPKP-UHFFFAOYSA-N

Clofenamide (or diumide) is a low-ceiling sulfonamide diuretic.
