= Piretanide =

Chemical compound

Clinical data
- Trade names: Arelix, Eurelix, Tauliz, others
- AHFS/Drugs.com: International Drug Names
- Routes of administration: By mouth
- ATC code: C03CA03 (WHO)

Legal status
- Legal status: EU: Rx-only; In general: ℞ (Prescription only)

Pharmacokinetic data
- Bioavailability: ~90%
- Protein binding: 96%
- Metabolism: not identified
- Excretion: Urine (60%), feces (40%)

Identifiers
- IUPAC name: 3-(aminosulfonyl)-4-phenoxy-5-pyrrolidin-1-ylbenzoic acid
- CAS Number: 55837-27-9
- PubChem CID: 4849
- IUPHAR/BPS: 4742
- DrugBank: DB02925
- ChemSpider: 4683
- UNII: DQ6KK6GV93
- KEGG: D01634
- CompTox Dashboard (EPA): DTXSID2023488
- ECHA InfoCard: 100.054.394

Chemical and physical data
- Formula: C_{17}H_{18}N_{2}O_{5}S
- Molar mass: 362.40 g·mol^{−1}
- 3D model (JSmol): Interactive image
- SMILES: NS(=O)(=O)c1c(Oc2ccccc2)c(N3CCCC3)cc(c1)C(=O)O
- InChI: InChI=1S/C17H18N2O5S/c18-25(22,23)15-11-12(17(20)21)10-14(19-8-4-5-9-19)16(15)24-13-6-2-1-3-7-13/h1-3,6-7,10-11H,4-5,8-9H2,(H,20,21)(H2,18,22,23); Key:UJEWTUDSLQGTOA-UHFFFAOYSA-N

Piretanide is a loop diuretic compound by using a then-new method for introducing cyclic amine residues in an aromatic nucleus in the presence of other aromatically bonded functional groups. Studies of piretanide in rats and dogs in comparison with other high-ceiling diuretics such as furosemide and bumetanide found a more suitable dose/response rate (regression line) and a more favourable sodium/potassium excretion ratio. These findings led eventually to studies in man and finally to the introduction as a saluretic and antihypertensive medication in Germany, France, Italy and other countries.

It was made in 1973, patented in 1974, and approved for medical use in 1981.

== Brand names ==
Brand names include Arelix, Eurelix, and Tauliz.
