= Mebutizide =

Chemical compound

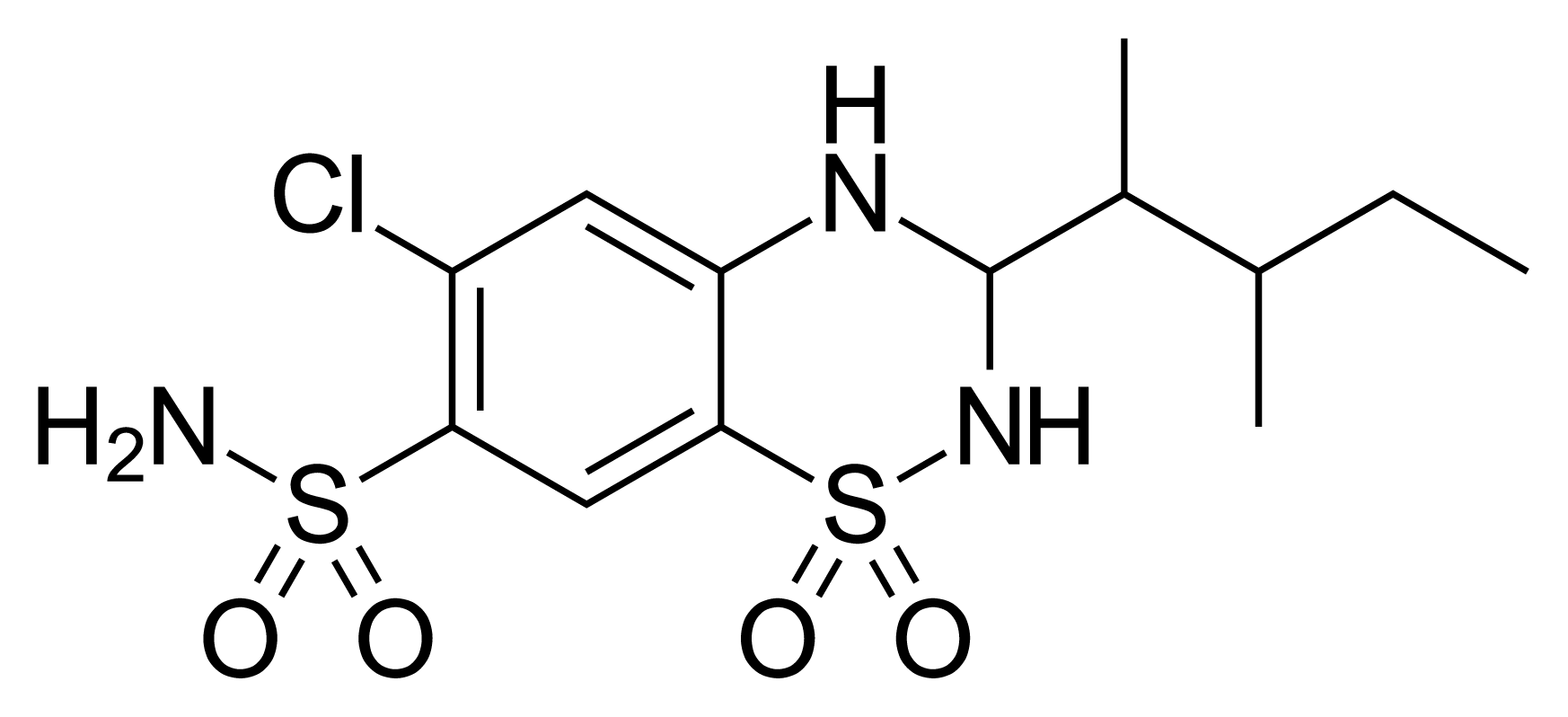

Clinical data
- ATC code: C03AA13 (WHO)

Identifiers
- IUPAC name: 6-Chloro-3-(1,2-dimethylbutyl)-3,4-dihydro-2H-1,2,4-benzothiadiazine-7-sulfonamide 1,1-dioxide
- CAS Number: 3568-00-1
- PubChem CID: 71652
- ChemSpider: 64712
- UNII: 7738AS8324
- KEGG: D07172
- CompTox Dashboard (EPA): DTXSID90863202
- ECHA InfoCard: 100.020.600

Chemical and physical data
- Formula: C_{13}H_{20}ClN_{3}O_{4}S_{2}
- Molar mass: 381.89 g·mol^{−1}
- 3D model (JSmol): Interactive image
- SMILES: CCC(C)C(C)C1NC2=CC(=C(C=C2S(=O)(=O)N1)S(=O)(=O)N)Cl
- InChI: InChI=1S/C13H20ClN3O4S2/c1-4-7(2)8(3)13-16-10-5-9(14)11(22(15,18)19)6-12(10)23(20,21)17-13/h5-8,13,16-17H,4H2,1-3H3,(H2,15,18,19); Key:KJLLKLRVCJAFRY-UHFFFAOYSA-N

Mebutizide is a diuretic.
