= Muzolimine =

Chemical compound

Clinical data
- ATC code: C03CD01 (WHO)

Legal status
- Legal status: Withdrawn

Identifiers
- IUPAC name: 5-amino-2-[1-(3,4-dichlorophenyl)ethyl]-4H-pyrazol-3-one
- CAS Number: 55294-15-0
- PubChem CID: 41386
- ChemSpider: 37766
- UNII: 07Z36289ZX
- KEGG: D05093
- CompTox Dashboard (EPA): DTXSID50866476
- ECHA InfoCard: 100.054.139

Chemical and physical data
- Formula: C_{11}H_{11}Cl_{2}N_{3}O
- Molar mass: 272.13 g·mol^{−1}
- 3D model (JSmol): Interactive image
- SMILES: O=C1CC(N)=NN1C(C)c2cc(Cl)c(Cl)cc2
- InChI: InChI=1S/C11H11Cl2N3O/c1-6(16-11(17)5-10(14)15-16)7-2-3-8(12)9(13)4-7/h2-4,6H,5H2,1H3,(H2,14,15); Key:RLWRMIYXDPXIEX-UHFFFAOYSA-N

Muzolimine is a high-ceiling loop diuretic. It is a pyrazole diuretic which was used for treatment of hypertension but was withdrawn worldwide because of severe neurological side effects.

== Synthesis ==
Muzolimine synthesis:

Rxn of (1-(3,4-dichlorophenyl)ethyl)hydrazine (1) with ethyl 3-amino-3-ethoxyacrylate (2) leads to a ring-forming two-site reaction and formation of the pyrazoline diuretic agent, muzolimine (3).
