= Clorexolone =

Chemical compound

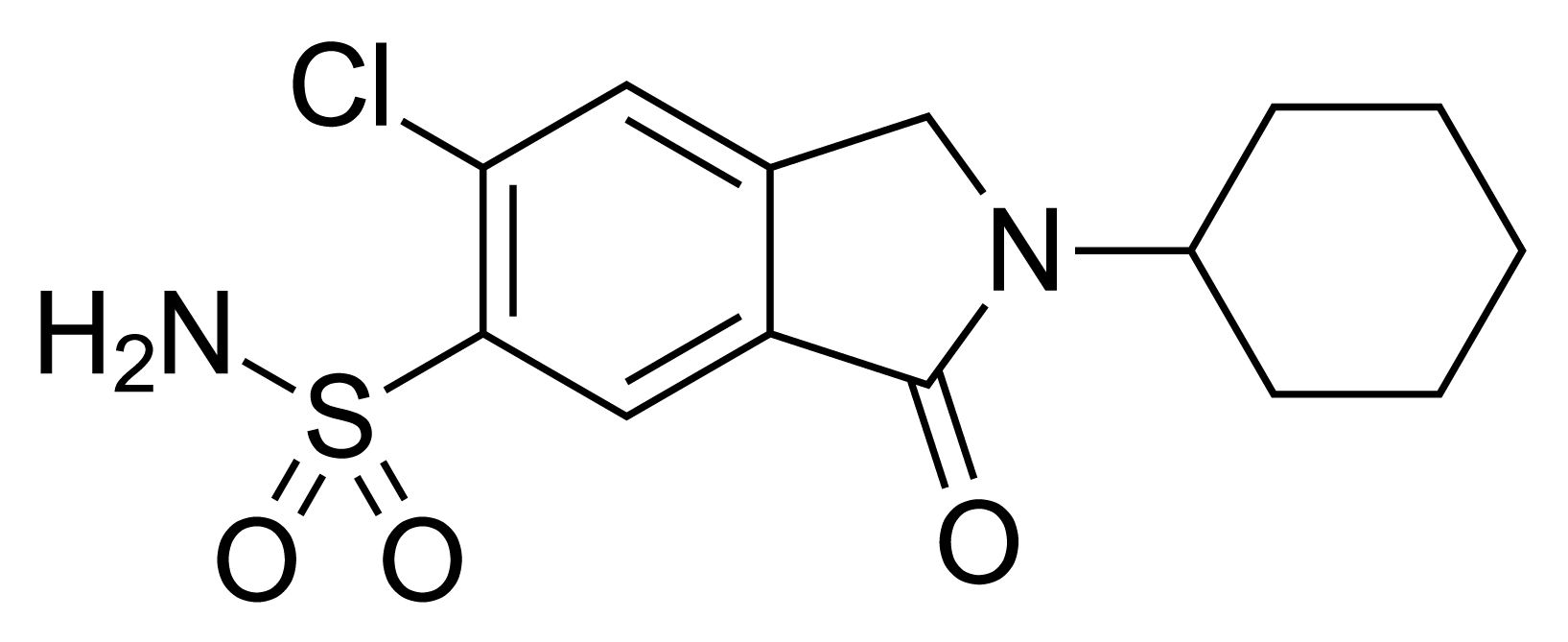

Clinical data
- ATC code: C03BA12 (WHO)

Identifiers
- IUPAC name: 6-chloro-2-cyclohexyl-3-oxo-2,3-dihydro- 1H-isoindole-5-sulfonamide
- CAS Number: 2127-01-7
- PubChem CID: 16473
- DrugBank: DB13617
- ChemSpider: 15615
- UNII: Q2PLT3FS05
- KEGG: D01436
- ChEMBL: ChEMBL2106167
- CompTox Dashboard (EPA): DTXSID4057683
- ECHA InfoCard: 100.016.675

Chemical and physical data
- Formula: C_{14}H_{17}ClN_{2}O_{3}S
- Molar mass: 328.81 g·mol^{−1}
- 3D model (JSmol): Interactive image
- SMILES: O=S(=O)(c1cc2C(=O)N(Cc2cc1Cl)C3CCCCC3)N

Clorexolone is a low-ceiling sulfonamide diuretic.
