= Chlorothiazide =

Chemical compound

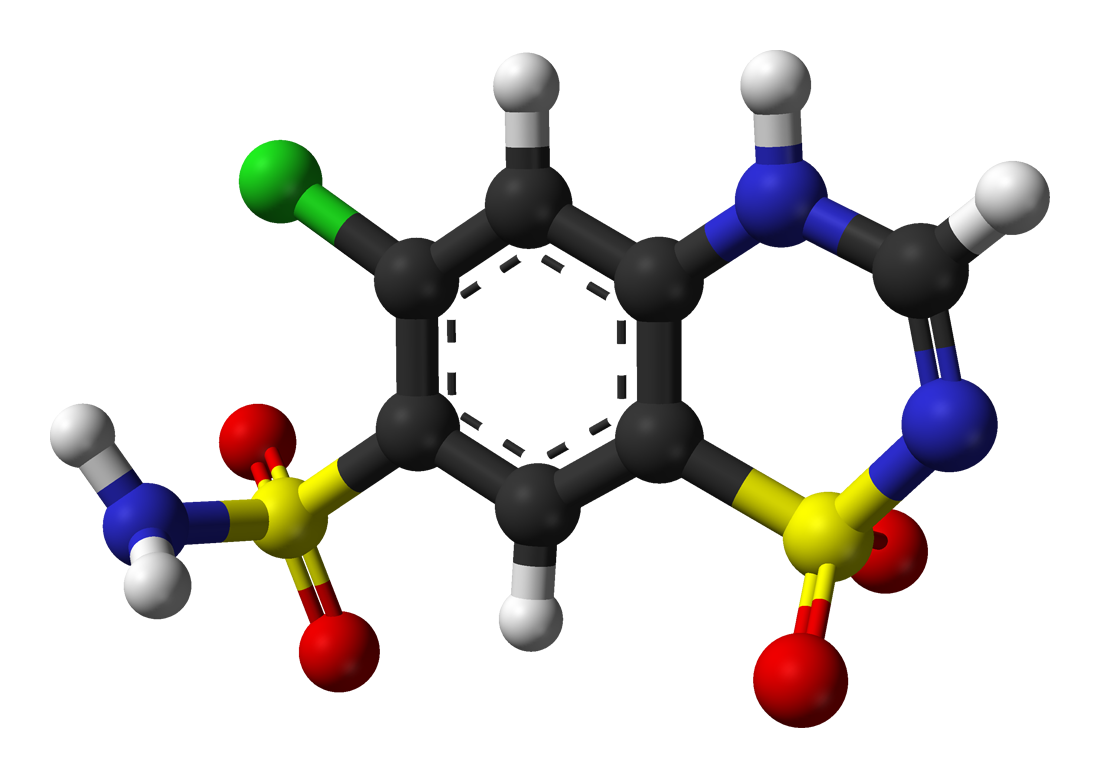

Clinical data
- Trade names: Diuril, others
- Other names: 6-Chloro-2H-1,2,4-benzothiadiazine-7-sulfonamide-1,1-dioxide
- AHFS/Drugs.com: Monograph
- MedlinePlus: a682341
- Routes of administration: By mouth, IV
- ATC code: C03AA04 (WHO)

Legal status
- Legal status: US: ℞-only

Pharmacokinetic data
- Bioavailability: low
- Metabolism: Nil
- Elimination half-life: 45 to 120 minutes
- Excretion: Renal

Identifiers
- IUPAC name: 6-chloro-1,1-dioxo-2H-1,2,4-benzothiadiazine-7-sulfonamide
- CAS Number: 58-94-6
- PubChem CID: 2720
- IUPHAR/BPS: 4835
- DrugBank: DB00880
- ChemSpider: 2619
- UNII: 77W477J15H
- KEGG: D00519
- ChEBI: CHEBI:3640
- ChEMBL: ChEMBL842
- CompTox Dashboard (EPA): DTXSID0022800
- ECHA InfoCard: 100.000.368

Chemical and physical data
- Formula: C_{7}H_{6}ClN_{3}O_{4}S_{2}
- Molar mass: 295.71 g·mol^{−1}
- 3D model (JSmol): Interactive image
- Melting point: 342.5–343 °C (648.5–649.4 °F)
- SMILES: O=S(=O)(c1c(Cl)cc2c(c1)S(=O)(=O)/N=C\N2)N
- InChI: InChI=1S/C7H6ClN3O4S2/c8-4-1-5-7(2-6(4)16(9,12)13)17(14,15)11-3-10-5/h1-3H,(H,10,11)(H2,9,12,13); Key:JBMKAUGHUNFTOL-UHFFFAOYSA-N

Chlorothiazide, sold under the brand name Diuril among others, is an organic compound used as a diuretic and as an antihypertensive.

It is used both within the hospital setting or for personal use to manage excess fluid associated with congestive heart failure. Most often taken in pill form, it is usually taken orally once or twice a day. In the ICU setting, chlorothiazide is given to diurese a patient in addition to furosemide (Lasix). Working in a separate mechanism from furosemide and absorbed enterically as a reconstituted suspension administered through a nasogastric tube (NG tube), the two drugs potentiate one another.

It was patented in 1956 and approved for medical use in 1958. It is on the World Health Organization's List of Essential Medicines.

== Indications ==
- Large amount of excess fluid including:
  - Heart failure
  - Peripheral edema
  - Hypertension

== Contraindications ==
- Anuria
- Allergies to sulfa drugs

== Side effects ==
- Nausea / Vomiting
- Headache
- Dizziness
- Excess urine production
- Dehydration
- Hypoelectrolytemia (esp. hypokalemia / hypomagnesia)

== History ==
The research team of Merck Sharp and Dohme Research Laboratories of Beyer, Sprague, Baer, and Novello created a new series of medications, the thiazide diuretics, which includes chlorothiazide. They won an Albert Lasker Special Award in 1975 for this work.

The structure has been determined by X-ray crystallography.

== See also ==
- Hydrochlorothiazide
