= Trichlormethiazide =

Chemical compound

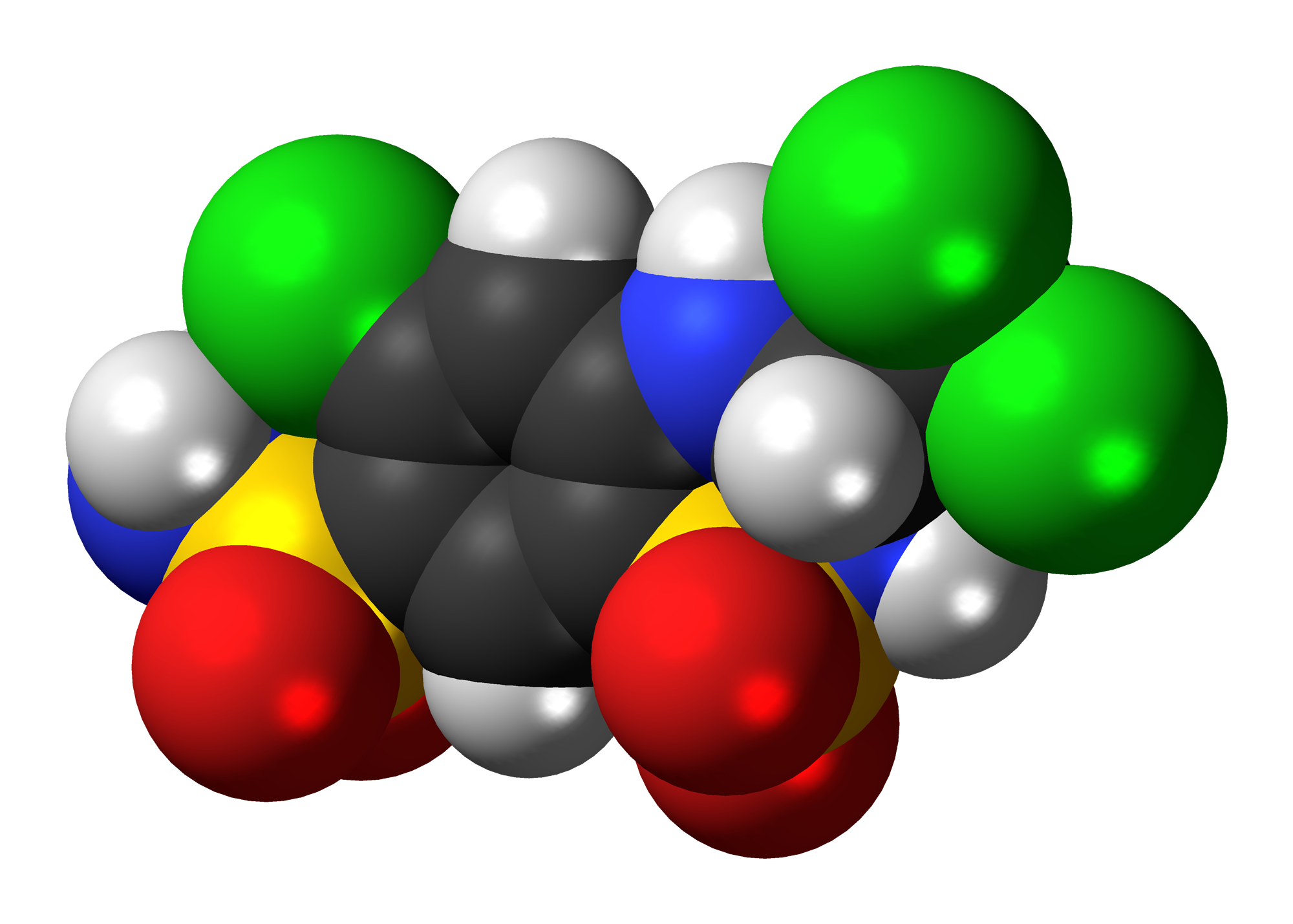

Clinical data
- AHFS/Drugs.com: Micromedex Detailed Consumer Information
- Pregnancy category: B (D if used to treat pregnancy-induced hypertension)
- Routes of administration: Oral (capsules, tablets, oral solution)
- ATC code: C03AA06 (WHO)

Legal status
- Legal status: In general: ℞ (Prescription only)

Pharmacokinetic data
- Bioavailability: Variably absorbed from GI tract
- Excretion: Primarily excreted unchanged in urine

Identifiers
- IUPAC name: 6-Chloro-3-(dichloromethyl)-1,1-dioxo-3,4-dihydro-2H-benzo[e][1,2,4]thiadiazine-7-sulfonamide
- CAS Number: 133-67-5
- PubChem CID: 5560
- IUPHAR/BPS: 7314
- DrugBank: DB01021
- ChemSpider: 5359
- UNII: Q58C92TUN0
- KEGG: D00658
- ChEMBL: ChEMBL1054
- CompTox Dashboard (EPA): DTXSID7023699
- ECHA InfoCard: 100.004.654

Chemical and physical data
- Formula: C_{8}H_{8}Cl_{3}N_{3}O_{4}S_{2}
- Molar mass: 380.64 g·mol^{−1}
- 3D model (JSmol): Interactive image
- SMILES: O=S(C1=C(C=C2C(S(=O)(NC(C(Cl)Cl)N2)=O)=C1)Cl)(N)=O

Trichlormethiazide (INN, currently being sold under the brand names of Achletin, Diu-Hydrin and Triflumen) is a diuretic with properties similar to those of hydrochlorothiazide. It is usually administered for the treatment of oedema (including that which is associated with heart failure, hepatic cirrhosis and corticosteroid therapy) and hypertension. In veterinary medicine, trichlormethiazide can be combined with dexamethasone to be used on horses with mild swelling of distal limbs and general bruising.

As a diuretic (in particular a thiazide), trichlormethiazide encourages water loss from the body. Trichlormethiazide works by inhibiting Na^{+}/Cl^{−} ion reabsorption from the distal tubules of the kidneys. In addition, trichlormethiazide increases the excretion of potassium.

== Mechanism ==
Trichlormethiazide appears to block the active reabsorption of chloride and possibly sodium in the ascending loop of Henle. This results in excretion of sodium, chloride and water, and thus acts as a diuretic. Although trichlormethiazide is used to treat hypertension, its hypotensive effects may not necessarily be due to its role as a diuretic. Thiazides in general cause vasodilation by activating calcium-activated potassium channels in vascular smooth muscles and inhibiting various carbonic anhydrases in vascular tissue.

== Synthesis ==
Trichlormethiazide synthesis:
