= Meticrane =

Chemical compound

Clinical data
- AHFS/Drugs.com: International Drug Names
- Routes of administration: Oral
- ATC code: C03BA09 (WHO)

Legal status
- Legal status: In general: ℞ (Prescription only)

Identifiers
- IUPAC name: 6-methylthiochromane-7-sulfonamide 1,1-dioxide
- CAS Number: 1084-65-7
- PubChem CID: 4165
- ChemSpider: 4021
- UNII: I7EKN1924Q
- CompTox Dashboard (EPA): DTXSID9045346
- ECHA InfoCard: 100.012.830

Chemical and physical data
- Formula: C_{10}H_{13}NO_{4}S_{2}
- Molar mass: 275.34 g·mol^{−1}
- 3D model (JSmol): Interactive image
- SMILES: CC1=C(C=C2C(=C1)CCCS2(=O)=O)S(=O)(=O)N
- InChI: InChI=1S/C10H13NO4S2/c1-7-5-8-3-2-4-16(12,13)10(8)6-9(7)17(11,14)15/h5-6H,2-4H2,1H3,(H2,11,14,15); Key:FNQQBFNIYODEMB-UHFFFAOYSA-N

Meticrane (INN) is a diuretic.
