= Cicletanine =

Chemical compound

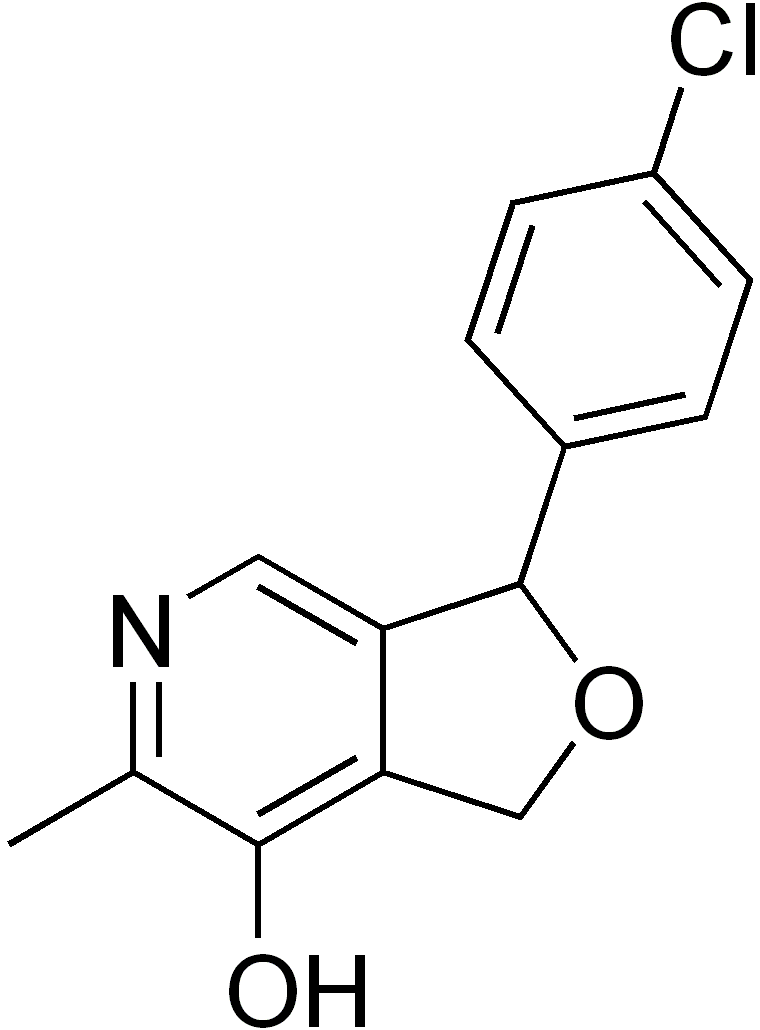

Clinical data
- AHFS/Drugs.com: International Drug Names
- Routes of administration: Oral
- ATC code: C03BX03 (WHO)

Pharmacokinetic data
- Protein binding: 99.6% for (-)cicletanine isomer; 87.5% for (+)cicletanine isomer
- Elimination half-life: 5.7 h. Also: Tmax = 0.750 hours. Plasma AUCinf = 29.0 μg·hr/mL. Cmax = 6.18 μg/mL. All figures are for a single oral dose of 150 mg.

Identifiers
- IUPAC name: 3-(4-Chlorophenyl)-6-methyl-1,3-dihydrofuro[3,4-c]pyridin-7-ol
- CAS Number: 89943-82-8
- PubChem CID: 54910
- ChemSpider: 49583
- UNII: CHG7QC509W
- KEGG: D03487
- ChEMBL: ChEMBL191886
- CompTox Dashboard (EPA): DTXSID70868972
- ECHA InfoCard: 100.158.583

Chemical and physical data
- Formula: C_{14}H_{12}ClNO_{2}
- Molar mass: 261.71 g·mol^{−1}
- 3D model (JSmol): Interactive image
- SMILES: Clc1ccc(cc1)C3OCc2c3cnc(c2O)C
- InChI: InChI=1S/C14H12ClNO2/c1-8-13(17)12-7-18-14(11(12)6-16-8)9-2-4-10(15)5-3-9/h2-6,14,17H,7H2,1H3; Key:CVKNDPRBJVBDSS-UHFFFAOYSA-N

Cicletanine is a furopyridine compound (i.e., has a pyridine ring fused to a furan ring) that is approved in France for the treatment of hypertension. The drug is most commonly known as a diuretic drug, but has a broader range of cardiovascular and metabolic activity characterized extensively in the literature (see "Mechanism" below).

Cicletanine was originated and in 1986 launched in France by Paris-based Ipsen, who in 2005 licensed marketing rights in France to Milan-based Recordati for several years (at least until 2010). Ipsen and Recordati both marketed cicletanine under the trade name Tenstaten. The drug is no longer manufactured nor sold by IPSEN; it is currently marketed in France by two generics manufacturers: Biogaran and Teva Pharmaceuticals.

Cicletanine has been shown to be differentially effective in salt-sensitive hypertension.

== Mechanism ==
According to its current French package insert, cicletanine is officially in the category of “Other cortical dilution segment diuretics.” (French: “Autres diurétiques du segment cortical de dilution.”) Internationally, cicletanine's ATC Code C03BX03 is a subcategory under C03BX “Other low-ceiling diuretics.” This categorization as a diuretic (without mention of other activity) is despite (1) very early indications that the drug had therapeutic activity beyond diuresis (in some cases at sub-diuretic doses) and (2) subsequent findings on multiple mechanisms of vasorelaxation. While cicletanine's first peer-reviewed publication (Lancet, 1983) reported diuretic activity, it associated that activity with prostacyclin, at the time known more as an important vasodilator than as a diuretic agent. In fact, the Nobel Prize in Physiology or Medicine was given the prior year to Sune Bergström, Bengt Samuelsson and John Vane for work on prostaglandins, including prostacyclin, which Vane had demonstrated to be a vasodilator and inhibitor of platelet aggregation.

Cicletanine's official categorization as a diuretic notwithstanding, the drug's antihypertensive activity as experienced in most patients involves relaxation of arteries more than decrease of vascular fluid volume (i.e., via diuresis). A significant majority of cicletanine patients take daily doses of 50 or 100 mg, while 150 mg is considered the minimum dose for appreciable diuretic activity. One market analysis reported that 66% of cicletanine patients were taking 50 mg per day and 33% were taking 100 mg per day. Consistent with clinical efficacy at sub-diuretic levels, cicletanine doses of 50 or 100 mg have been successful in significantly decreasing blood pressure in clinical trials involving (in aggregate) thousands of patients.

While a comprehensive survey of cicletanine's mechanism of action has yet to be published, it is now known that the drug's vasorelaxant activity is due to (1) reversal of endothelial dysfunction via activation of eNOS (endothelial nitric oxide synthase), and (2) increase of prostacyclin.

In research conducted at the US NIH, cicletanine has been demonstrated as an inhibitor of protein kinase C and marinobufagenin.
