= Metostilenol =

Chemical compound

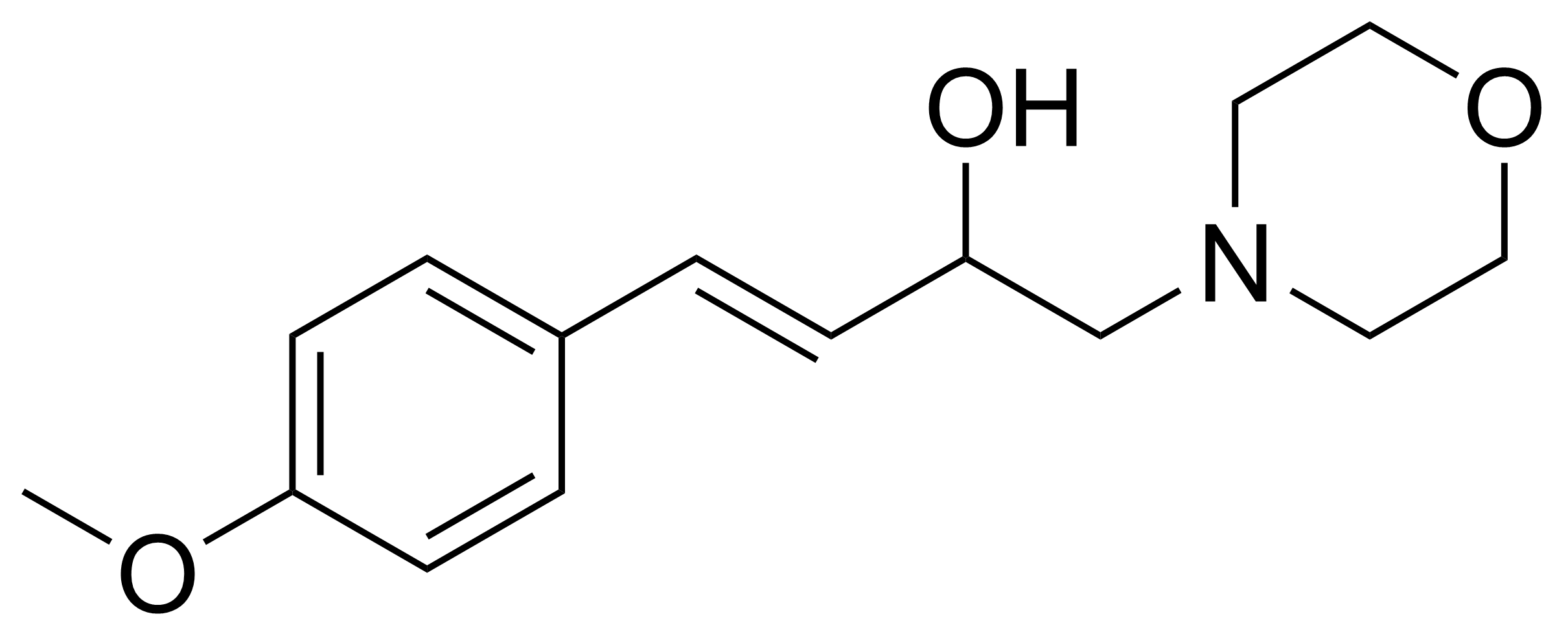

Clinical data
- ATC code: None

Identifiers
- IUPAC name: (3E)-4-(4-methoxyphenyl)-1-morpholin-4-ylbut-3-en-2-ol
- CAS Number: 103980-45-6
- PubChem CID: 6446648
- ChemSpider: 4950173
- UNII: 737T1YVX89
- CompTox Dashboard (EPA): DTXSID70883125

Chemical and physical data
- Formula: C_{15}H_{21}NO_{3}
- Molar mass: 263.337 g·mol^{−1}
- 3D model (JSmol): Interactive image
- SMILES: OC(\C=C\c1ccc(OC)cc1)CN2CCOCC2

Metostilenol is a drug which was patented as an antidepressant in the early 1980s, but was never marketed.
