= Clopamide =

Chemical compound

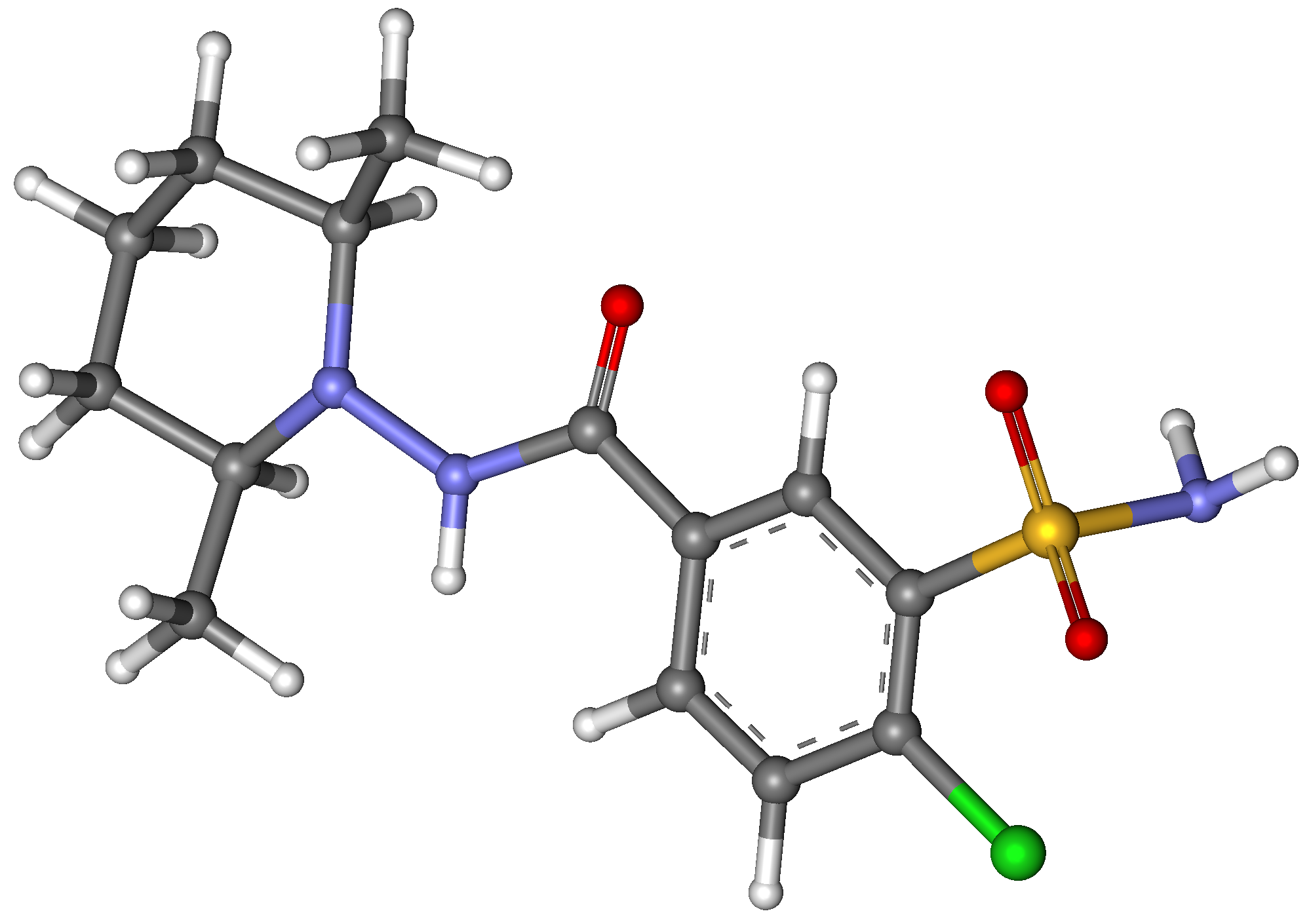

Clinical data
- Trade names: Brinaldix
- AHFS/Drugs.com: International Drug Names
- ATC code: C03BA03 (WHO)

Identifiers
- IUPAC name: 4-chloro-N-(2,6-dimethyl-1-piperidyl)-3-sulfamoyl- benzamide
- CAS Number: 636-54-4
- PubChem CID: 2804
- ChemSpider: 2702
- UNII: 17S83WON0I
- KEGG: D02460
- ChEMBL: ChEMBL1361347
- CompTox Dashboard (EPA): DTXSID1022847
- ECHA InfoCard: 100.010.238

Chemical and physical data
- Formula: C_{14}H_{20}ClN_{3}O_{3}S
- Molar mass: 345.84 g·mol^{−1}
- 3D model (JSmol): Interactive image
- SMILES: O=C(NN1C(CCCC1C)C)c2ccc(Cl)c(c2)S(=O)(=O)N
- InChI: InChI=1S/C14H20ClN3O3S/c1-9-4-3-5-10(2)18(9)17-14(19)11-6-7-12(15)13(8-11)22(16,20)21/h6-10H,3-5H2,1-2H3,(H,17,19)(H2,16,20,21); Key:LBXHRAWDUMTPSE-UHFFFAOYSA-N

Clopamide (trade name Brinaldix) is a piperidine diuretic.

== Mechanism of action ==
Clopamide is categorised as a thiazide-like diuretic and works in similar way as the thiazide diuretics do. It acts in the kidneys, at the distal convoluted tubule (DCT) of the nephron where it inhibits the sodium-chloride symporter. Clopamide selectively binds at the chloride binding site of the sodium-chloride symporter in the PCT cells on the luminal (interior) side and thus interferes with the reabsorption of sodium chloride, causing an equiosmolar excretion of water along with sodium chloride.
