= Epitizide =

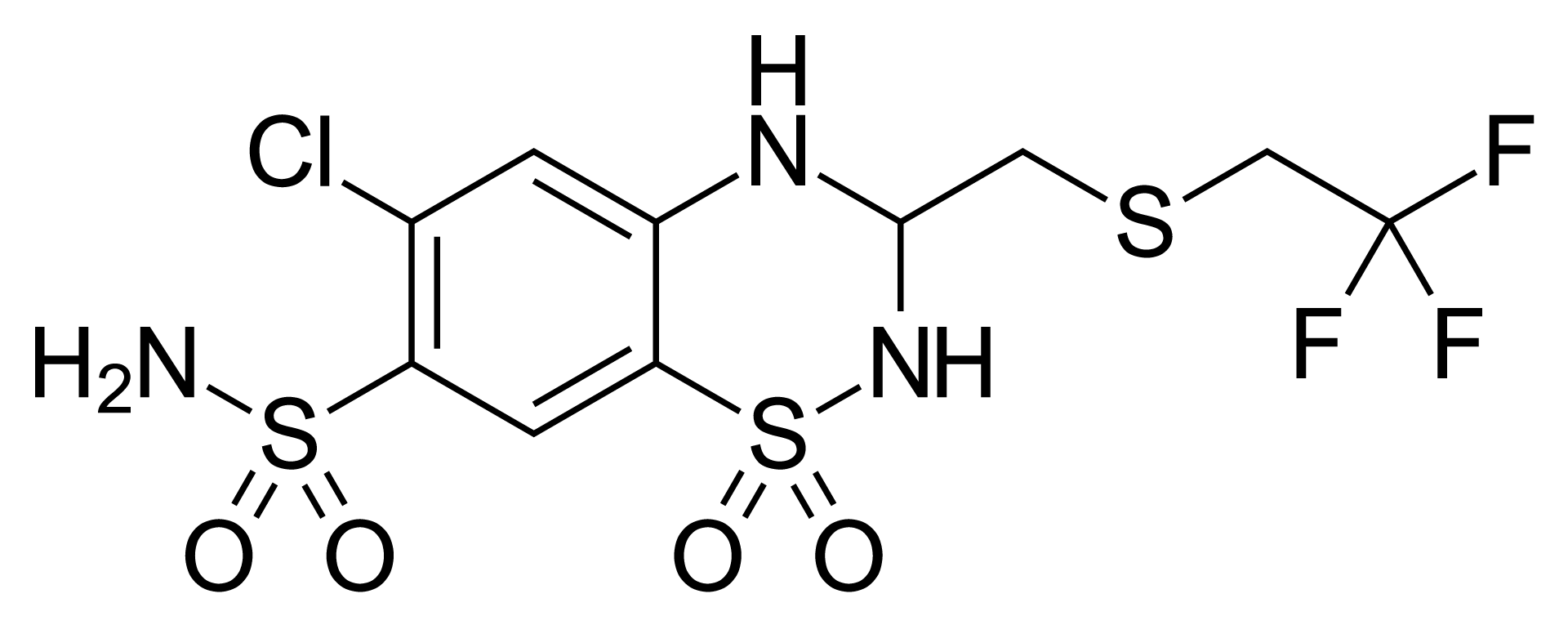

Names
- Preferred IUPAC name 6-Chloro-1,1-dioxo-3-{[(2,2,2-trifluoroethyl)sulfanyl]methyl}-1,2,3,4-tetrahydro-1λ^{6},2,4-benzothiadiazine-7-sulfonamide

Identifiers
CAS Number	1764-85-8
3D model (JSmol)	Interactive image
ChemSpider	14906
ECHA InfoCard	100.015.620
EC Number	217-181-9
KEGG	D04033
PubChem CID	15671
UNII	5B266B85J1
CompTox Dashboard (EPA)	DTXSID50862751
- InChI: InChI=1S/C10H11ClF3N3O4S3/c11-5-1-6-8(2-7(5)23(15,18)19)24(20,21)17-9(16-6)3-22-4-10(12,13)14/h1-2,9,16-17H,3-4H2,(H2,15,18,19) Key: RINBGYCKMGDWPY-UHFFFAOYSA-N; InChI=1/C10H11ClF3N3O4S3/c11-5-1-6-8(2-7(5)23(15,18)19)24(20,21)17-9(16-6)3-22-4-10(12,13)14/h1-2,9,16-17H,3-4H2,(H2,15,18,19) Key: RINBGYCKMGDWPY-UHFFFAOYAQ
- SMILES: C1=C2C(=CC(=C1Cl)S(=O)(=O)N)S(=O)(=O)NC(N2)CSCC(F)(F)F

Properties
Chemical formula	C_{10}H_{11}ClF_{3}N_{3}O_{4}S_{3}
Molar mass	425.85525

Pharmacology
ATC code	C03EA03 (WHO) (combination with potassium-sparing diuretics)
- Except where otherwise noted, data are given for materials in their standard state (at 25 °C [77 °F], 100 kPa). verify (what is ?) Infobox references

Epitizide is a diuretic. It is often combined with triamterene.
