= Xipamide =

Chemical compound used as a diuretic

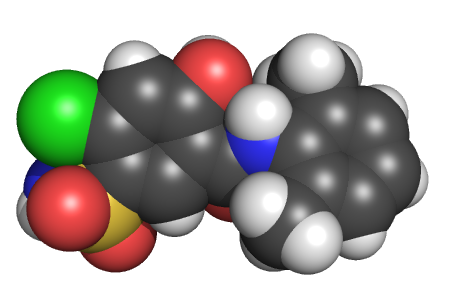

Clinical data
- AHFS/Drugs.com: International Drug Names
- Pregnancy category: contraindication
- Routes of administration: By mouth
- ATC code: C03BA10 (WHO)

Legal status
- Legal status: In general: ℞ (Prescription only)

Pharmacokinetic data
- Bioavailability: 95%
- Protein binding: 98%
- Metabolism: glucuronide (30%)
- Elimination half-life: 5.8 to 8.2 hours
- Excretion: kidney (1/3) and bile duct (2/3)

Identifiers
- IUPAC name: 4-chloro-N-(2,6-dimethylphenyl)-2-hydroxy-5-sulfamoylbenzamide
- CAS Number: 14293-44-8
- PubChem CID: 26618
- IUPHAR/BPS: 7900
- ChemSpider: 24795
- UNII: 4S9EY0NUEC
- KEGG: D06341
- ChEMBL: ChEMBL517199
- CompTox Dashboard (EPA): DTXSID5023744
- ECHA InfoCard: 100.034.727

Chemical and physical data
- Formula: C_{15}H_{15}ClN_{2}O_{4}S
- Molar mass: 354.81 g·mol^{−1}
- 3D model (JSmol): Interactive image
- SMILES: CC1=C(C(=CC=C1)C)NC(=O)C2=CC(=C(C=C2O)Cl)S(=O)(=O)N
- InChI: InChI=1S/C15H15ClN2O4S/c1-8-4-3-5-9(2)14(8)18-15(20)10-6-13(23(17,21)22)11(16)7-12(10)19/h3-7,19H,1-2H3,(H,18,20)(H2,17,21,22); Key:MTZBBNMLMNBNJL-UHFFFAOYSA-N

Xipamide (/ˈzɪpəmaɪd/) is a sulfonamide diuretic drug marketed by Eli Lilly under the trade names Aquaphor (in Germany) and Aquaphoril (in Austria). It is used for the treatment of oedema and hypertension.

== Mechanism of action ==
Like the structurally related thiazide diuretics, xipamide acts on the kidneys to reduce sodium reabsorption in the distal convoluted tubule. This increases the osmolarity in the lumen, causing less water to be reabsorbed by the collecting ducts. This leads to increased urinary output. Unlike the thiazides, xipamide reaches its target from the peritubular side (blood side).

Additionally, it increases the secretion of potassium in the distal tubule and collecting ducts. In high doses it also inhibits the enzyme carbonic anhydrase which leads to increased secretion of bicarbonate and alkalizes the urine.

Unlike with thiazides, only terminal kidney failure renders xipamide ineffective.

== Uses ==
Xipamide is used for

- cardiac oedema caused by decompensation of heart failure
- renal oedema, chronic renal disease (but not with anuria)
- hepatic oedema caused by cirrhosis
- ascites
- lymphoedema
- hypertension in combination with chronic renal disease

== Pharmacokinetics ==
After oral administration, 20 mg of xipamide are resorbed quickly and reach the peak plasma concentration of 3 mg/L within an hour. The diuretic effect starts about an hour after administration, reaches its peak between the third and sixth hour, and lasts for nearly 24 hours.

One third of the dose is glucuronidized, the rest is excreted directly through the kidney (1/3) and the faeces (2/3). The total plasma clearance is 30-40 mL/min. Xipamide can be filtrated by haemodialysis but not by peritoneal dialysis.

== Dosage ==
Initially 40 mg, it can be reduced to 10–20 mg to prevent a relapse.

The lowest effective dose is 5 mg. More than 60 mg have no additional effects.

== Adverse effects ==
- more than 1/10 of all patients
  - hypokalaemia, which can lead to nausea, muscular weakness or cramps, and ECG abnormities
- 1/100 to 1/10
  - hyponatraemia, which can lead to headache, nausea, drowsiness or confusion
  - orthostatic hypotension
  - initially increase of urea, uric acid and creatinine, which can lead to a gout attack in predisposed patients
- 1/1000 to 1/10,000
  - allergic reactions of the skin
  - hyperlipidaemia
- less than 1/10,000
  - haemorrhagic pancreatitis
  - acute interstitial nephritis
  - thrombocytopenia, leucopenia

== Contraindications ==
- anuria
- praecoma and coma hepaticum
- hypovolemia, hyponatremia, hypokalemia
- hypercalcemia
- gout
- sulfonamide hypersensitivity
- pregnancy, lactation period

== Interactions ==
=== Not recommended combinations ===
- Xipamide lowers the renal clearance of lithium which can lead to lithium intoxication. (This interaction is classified as medium.)

=== Combinations requiring special precautions ===
The product information requests special precautions for these combinations:

- The antihypertensive effect can be increased by ACE inhibitors, barbiturates, phenothiazines, tricyclic antidepressants, alcohol, etc. (Classified as minor.)
- NSAIDs can reduce the antihypertensive and diuretic effects. Xipamide increases the neurotoxicity of high doses of salicylates. (Classified as minor.)
- Toxicity of cardiac glycosides is increased due to hypokalemia and hypomagnesemia.(Classified as minor.)
- Antiarrhythmic agents (classes Ia and III), phenothiazines and other antipsychotics increase the risk of torsades de pointes due to hypokalemia.

=== Interactions not included in the product information ===
- Xipamide can reduce the effect of antidiabetics. (Classified as minor.)

== Banned use in sport ==
On 17 July 2012, cyclist Fränk Schleck was removed from the Tour de France by his team RadioShack-Nissan after his A-sample returned traces of xipamide.
