= Methastyridone =

Group of stereoisomers

Clinical data
- ATC code: none

Identifiers
- IUPAC name: 2,2-dimethyl-5-[(E)-2-phenylethenyl]-1,3-oxazolidin-4-one
- CAS Number: 721-19-7
- PubChem CID: 6083100
- ChemSpider: 4801920
- UNII: C1846N9AVW
- CompTox Dashboard (EPA): DTXSID60862388

Chemical and physical data
- Formula: C_{13}H_{15}NO_{2}
- Molar mass: 217.268 g·mol^{−1}
- 3D model (JSmol): Interactive image
- SMILES: CC1(C)NC(=O)C(O1)\C=C\c2ccccc2
- InChI: InChI=1S/C13H15NO2/c1-13(2)14-12(15)11(16-13)9-8-10-6-4-3-5-7-10/h3-9,11H,1-2H3,(H,14,15)/b9-8+; Key:VEZXEOWXHFHYHC-CMDGGOBGSA-N

Methastyridone is a centrally acting stimulant, whose mode of action differs from that of classical agents such as d-amphetamine.
