= Quinethazone =

Chemical compound

Clinical data
- AHFS/Drugs.com: Micromedex Detailed Consumer Information
- Routes of administration: Oral
- ATC code: C03BA02 (WHO)

Legal status
- Legal status: In general: ℞ (Prescription only)

Identifiers
- IUPAC name: 7-chloro-2-ethyl-4-oxo-1,2,3,4-tetrahydroquinazoline- 6-sulfonamide
- CAS Number: 73-49-4
- PubChem CID: 6307
- IUPHAR/BPS: 7289
- DrugBank: DB01325
- ChemSpider: 6068
- UNII: 455E0S048W
- KEGG: D00461
- ChEMBL: ChEMBL1532
- CompTox Dashboard (EPA): DTXSID9023548
- ECHA InfoCard: 100.000.729

Chemical and physical data
- Formula: C_{10}H_{12}ClN_{3}O_{3}S
- Molar mass: 289.73 g·mol^{−1}
- 3D model (JSmol): Interactive image
- SMILES: O=S(=O)(c2c(Cl)cc1c(C(=O)NC(N1)CC)c2)N
- InChI: InChI=1S/C10H12ClN3O3S/c1-2-9-13-7-4-6(11)8(18(12,16)17)3-5(7)10(15)14-9/h3-4,9,13H,2H2,1H3,(H,14,15)(H2,12,16,17); Key:AGMMTXLNIQSRCG-UHFFFAOYSA-N

Quinethazone (INN, brand name Hydromox) is a thiazide-like diuretic used to treat hypertension. Common side effects include dizziness, dry mouth, nausea, and low potassium levels.
