= Polythiazide =

Chemical compound

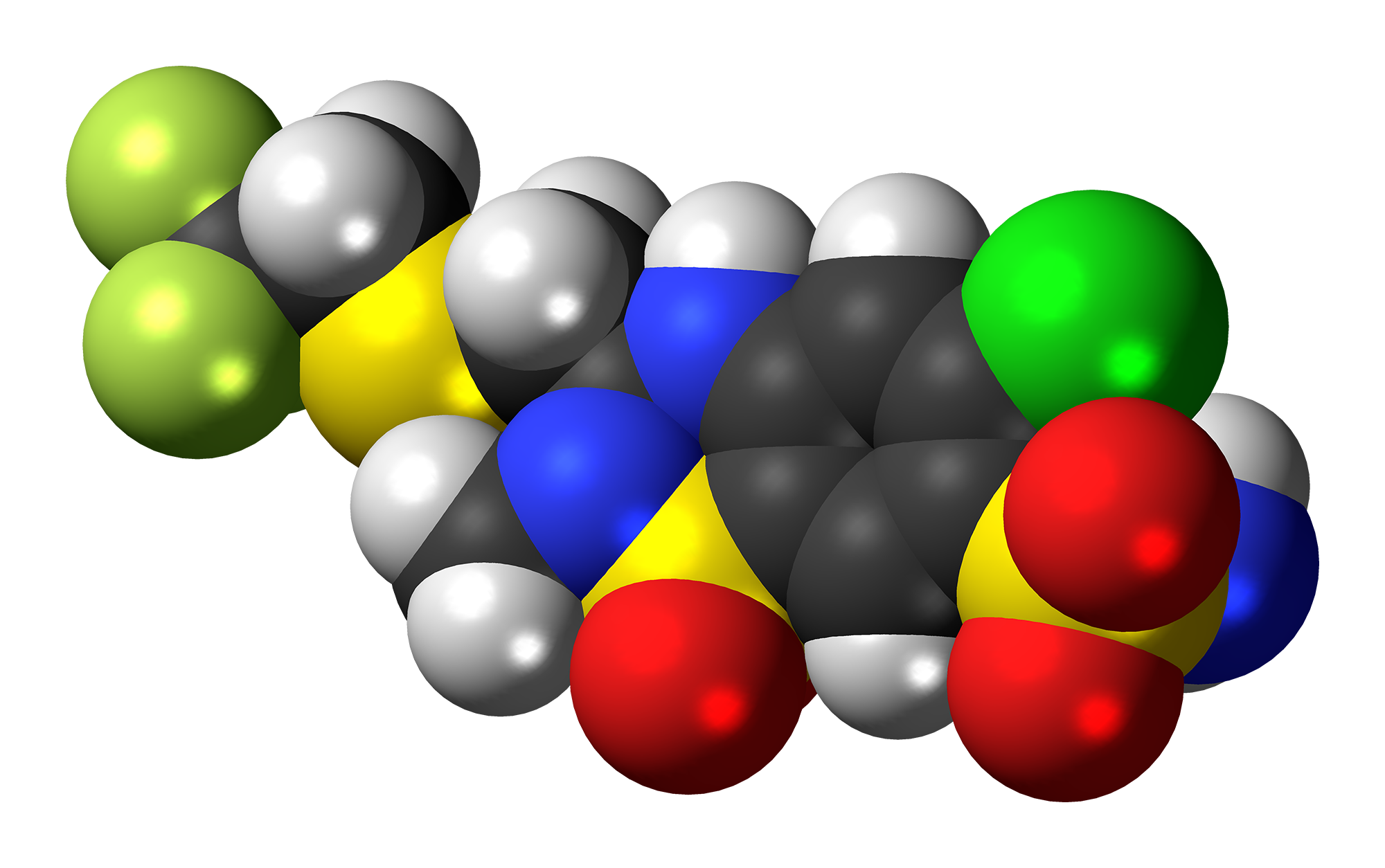

Clinical data
- AHFS/Drugs.com: Micromedex Detailed Consumer Information
- MedlinePlus: a601101
- ATC code: C03AA05 (WHO)

Identifiers
- IUPAC name: 6-chloro-2-methyl-3-{[(2,2,2-trifluoroethyl)thio]methyl}-3,4-dihydro-2H-1,2,4-benzothiadiazine-7-sulfonamide 1,1-dioxide
- CAS Number: 346-18-9
- PubChem CID: 4870
- IUPHAR/BPS: 7274
- ChemSpider: 4704
- UNII: 36780APV5N
- KEGG: D00657
- ChEMBL: ChEMBL1587
- CompTox Dashboard (EPA): DTXSID6025939
- ECHA InfoCard: 100.005.881

Chemical and physical data
- Formula: C_{11}H_{13}ClF_{3}N_{3}O_{4}S_{3}
- Molar mass: 439.87 g·mol^{−1}
- 3D model (JSmol): Interactive image
- SMILES: O=S(C1=CC(S(=O)(N(C(CSCC(F)(F)F)N2)C)=O)=C2C=C1Cl)(N)=O

Polythiazide is a thiazide diuretic.
