= Metiprenaline =

Clinical data
- Other names: Egyt 402; O-Methylisoprenaline; Methylprenaline; 3-Methoxyisoprenaline; MOXA; 3-Methoxyisoproterenol; 3-O-Methylisoprenaline; 3-O-Methylisoproterenol
- Drug class: Bronchodilator

Identifiers
- IUPAC name: 4-[1-hydroxy-2-(propan-2-ylamino)ethyl]-2-methoxyphenol
- CAS Number: 1212-03-9
- PubChem CID: 68951
- ChemSpider: 62174
- UNII: 1WBF92D66N
- ChEMBL: ChEMBL2074647
- CompTox Dashboard (EPA): DTXSID20862602

Chemical and physical data
- Formula: C_{12}H_{19}NO_{3}
- Molar mass: 225.288 g·mol^{−1}
- 3D model (JSmol): Interactive image
- SMILES: CC(C)NCC(C1=CC(=C(C=C1)O)OC)O
- InChI: InChI=1S/C12H19NO3/c1-8(2)13-7-11(15)9-4-5-10(14)12(6-9)16-3/h4-6,8,11,13-15H,7H2,1-3H3; Key:XXCCGRRUBBGZRE-UHFFFAOYSA-N

Metiprenaline (INN; developmental code name Egyt 402), also known as 3-O-methylisoprenaline, is a bronchodilator which was never marketed. It is the 3-O-methyl derivative of isoprenaline (isoproterenol).
