= Methyclothiazide =

Diuretic drug

Clinical data
- Trade names: Enduron
- AHFS/Drugs.com: Consumer Drug Information
- MedlinePlus: a682569
- ATC code: C03AA08 (WHO)

Identifiers
- IUPAC name: 6-Chloro-3-(chloromethyl)-2-methyl-3,4-dihydro-2H-1,2,4-benzothiadiazine-7-sulfonamide 1,1-dioxide
- CAS Number: 135-07-9
- PubChem CID: 4121
- IUPHAR/BPS: 7235
- DrugBank: DB00232
- ChemSpider: 3978
- UNII: L3H46UAC61
- KEGG: D00656
- ChEMBL: ChEMBL1577
- CompTox Dashboard (EPA): DTXSID6023313
- ECHA InfoCard: 100.004.703

Chemical and physical data
- Formula: C_{9}H_{11}Cl_{2}N_{3}O_{4}S_{2}
- Molar mass: 360.22 g·mol^{−1}
- 3D model (JSmol): Interactive image
- SMILES: O=S(C1=CC(S(=O)(N(C(CCl)N2)C)=O)=C2C=C1Cl)(N)=O

Methyclothiazide (trade name Enduron) is a thiazide diuretic.
