= Metolazone =

Chemical compound

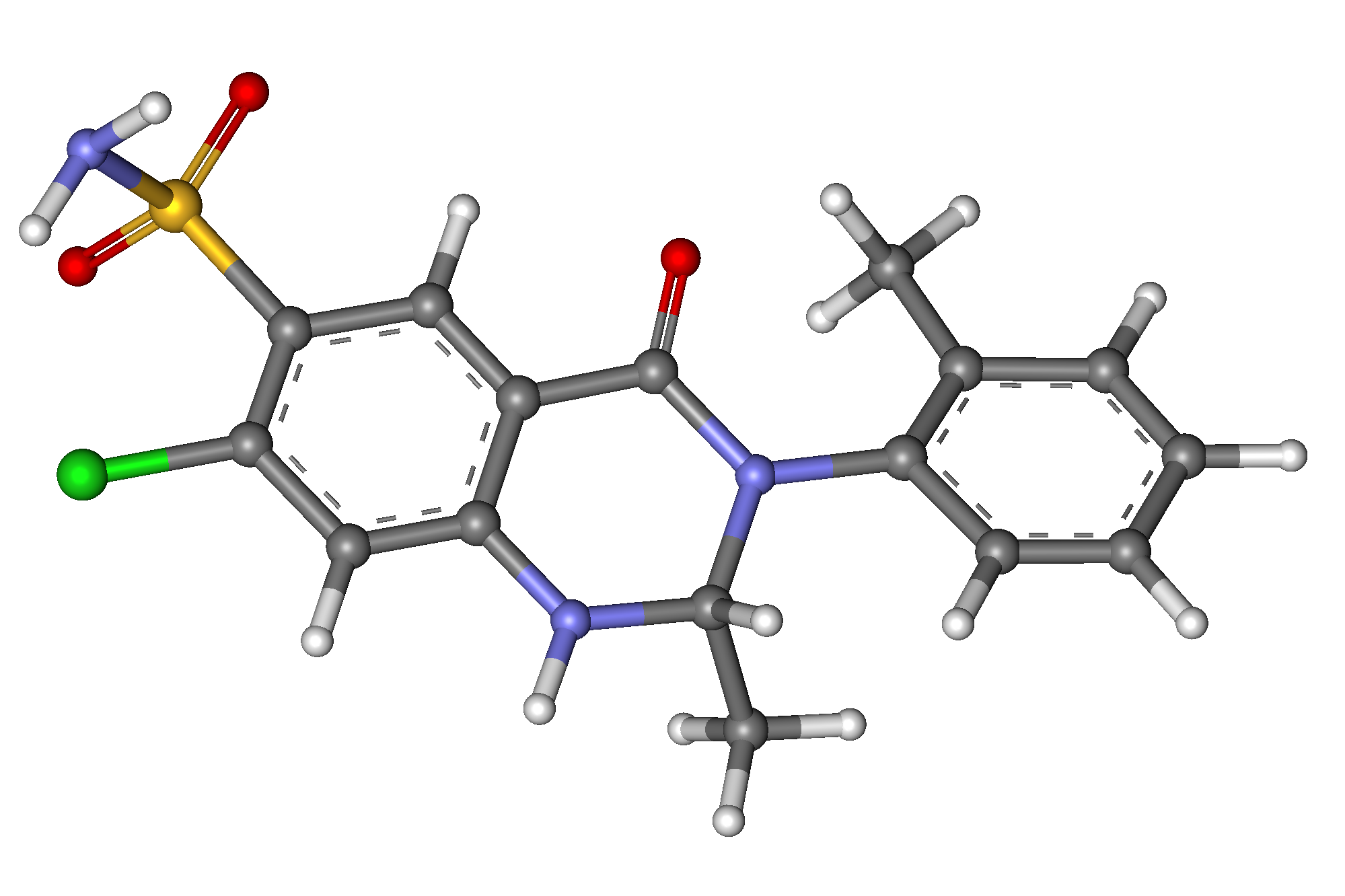

Clinical data
- Trade names: Zaroxolyn
- AHFS/Drugs.com: Monograph
- MedlinePlus: a682345
- Pregnancy category: B
- Routes of administration: By mouth
- ATC code: C03BA08 (WHO)

Legal status
- Legal status: In general: ℞ (Prescription only)

Pharmacokinetic data
- Bioavailability: ~65%
- Metabolism: kidney (minimal)
- Elimination half-life: 14 hours
- Excretion: primarily urine

Identifiers
- IUPAC name: 7-chloro-2-methyl-4-oxo-3-o-tolyl-1,2,3,4-tetrahydroquinazoline-6-sulfonamide
- CAS Number: 17560-51-9
- PubChem CID: 4170
- IUPHAR/BPS: 4838
- DrugBank: DB00524
- ChemSpider: 4026
- UNII: TZ7V40X7VX
- KEGG: D00431
- ChEBI: CHEBI:64354
- ChEMBL: ChEMBL878
- CompTox Dashboard (EPA): DTXSID6045167
- ECHA InfoCard: 100.037.748

Chemical and physical data
- Formula: C_{16}H_{16}ClN_{3}O_{3}S
- Molar mass: 365.83 g·mol^{−1}
- 3D model (JSmol): Interactive image
- Melting point: 260 °C (500 °F)
- SMILES: O=S(=O)(c3c(Cl)cc2c(C(=O)N(c1ccccc1C)C(N2)C)c3)N
- InChI: InChI=1S/C16H16ClN3O3S/c1-9-5-3-4-6-14(9)20-10(2)19-13-8-12(17)15(24(18,22)23)7-11(13)16(20)21/h3-8,10,19H,1-2H3,(H2,18,22,23); Key:AQCHWTWZEMGIFD-UHFFFAOYSA-N

Metolazone is a thiazide-like diuretic marketed under the brand names Zytanix, Metoz, Zaroxolyn, and Mykrox. It is primarily used to treat congestive heart failure and high blood pressure. Metolazone indirectly decreases the amount of water reabsorbed into the bloodstream by the kidney, so that blood volume decreases and urine volume increases. This lowers blood pressure and prevents excess fluid accumulation in heart failure. Metolazone is sometimes used together with loop diuretics such as furosemide or bumetanide, but these highly effective combinations can lead to dehydration and electrolyte abnormalities.

It was patented in 1966 and approved for medical use in 1974.

== Medical uses ==
One of the primary uses of metolazone is for treating edema (fluid retention) associated with congestive heart failure (CHF). In mild heart failure, metolazone or another diuretic may be used alone, or combined with other diuretics for moderate or severe heart failure. In addition to preventing fluid buildup, the use of metolazone may allow the patient to relax the amount of sodium restriction that is required. Although most thiazide diuretics lose their effectiveness in kidney failure, metolazone remains active even when the glomerular filtration rate (GFR) is below 30–40 mL/min (moderate chronic kidney disease). This gives it a considerable advantage over other thiazide diuretics, since renal and heart failure often coexist and contribute to fluid retention.

Metolazone may also be used in kidney disease, such as chronic kidney disease or the nephrotic syndrome. Chronic kidney disease causes excess fluid retention that is often treated with diet adjustments and diuretics. Metolazone may be combined with other diuretics (typically loop diuretics) to treat diuretic resistance in congestive heart failure, chronic kidney disease, and nephrotic syndrome. Metolazone and a loop diuretic will synergistically enhance diuresis over the use of either agent alone. Using this combination, diuretic effects will occur at two different segments of the nephron; namely, the loop diuretic will act at the loop of Henle, and metolazone will act at the distal convoluted tubule. Metolazone is frequently prescribed in addition to the loop diuretic. Metolazone may be used for edema caused by liver cirrhosis as well.

The other major use of metolazone is in treating hypertension (high blood pressure). Thiazide diuretics, though usually not metolazone, are very often used alone as first-line treatment for mild hypertension. They are also used in combination with other drugs for difficult-to-treat or more severe hypertension. "The Seventh Report of the Joint National Committee on Prevention, Detection, Evaluation, and Treatment of High Blood Pressure" (JNC 7) recommends thiazide diuretics as the initial medication for treatment of hypertension. Hydrochlorothiazide is by far the most commonly used, as it is both better-studied and cheaper (about four times) than metolazone, although as mentioned above metolazone is used in patients with moderate chronic kidney disease.

== Toxicity ==
Since thiazide diuretics affect the transport of electrolytes and water in the kidney, they can be responsible for abnormalities of water balance and electrolyte levels. Removal of too much fluid can cause volume depletion and hypotension. Various electrolyte abnormalities may result, including hyponatremia (low sodium), hypokalemia (low potassium), hypochloremia (low chloride), hypomagnesemia (low magnesium), hypercalcemia (high calcium), and hyperuricemia (high uric acid). These may result in dizziness, headache, or heart arrhythmias (palpitations). Serious, though rare, side effects include aplastic anemia, pancreatitis, agranulocytosis, and angioedema. Metolazone, like other thiazide diuretics, may unmask latent diabetes mellitus or exacerbate gout, especially by interacting with medicines used to treat gout. In addition, thiazide diuretics, including metolazone, are sulfonamides; those with hypersensitivity to sulfonamides ("sulfa allergy") may also be allergic to metolazone.

== Mechanism of action ==
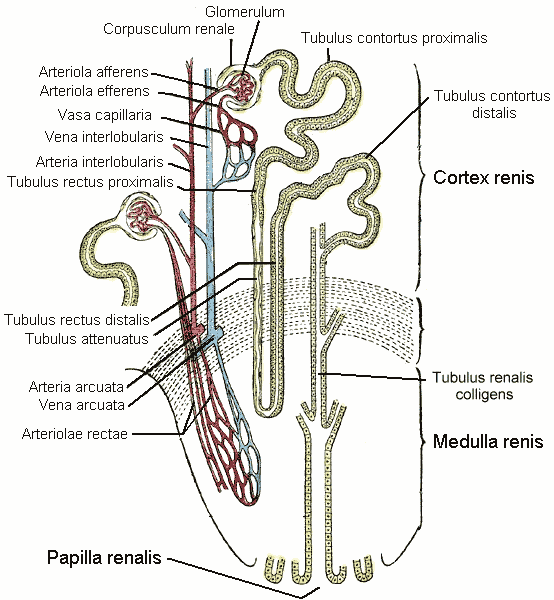
Schematic of a nephron. The distal convoluted tubule and proximal convoluted tubule are labeled in Latin ("tubulus contortus proximalis" and "tubulus contortus distalis") in this illustration.

The primary target of all thiazide diuretics, including metolazone, is the distal convoluted tubule, part of the nephron in the kidney, where they inhibit the sodium-chloride symporter.

In the kidney, blood is filtered into the lumen, or open space, of the nephron tubule. Whatever remains in the tubule will travel to the bladder as urine and eventually be excreted. The cells lining the tubule modify the fluid inside, absorbing some material and excreting others. One side of the cell (the apical side) faces the lumen; the opposite side (the basolateral side) faces the interstitial space near blood vessels. The other sides are tightly joined to neighboring cells.

As with other regions, tubule cells in the distal convoluted tubule possess the ATP-powered sodium-potassium antiporter (Na^{+}/K^{+}-ATPase), which uses energy from ATP to transfer three sodium ions out from the basolateral surface (toward blood vessels) while simultaneously transferring two potassium ions in. The distal convoluted tubule cells also possess a sodium-chloride symporter on the apical side, which passively allows one sodium ion and one chloride ion to diffuse together in from the lumen (where urine is forming) into the cell interior. As sodium is pumped out of the cell by the ATPase, its intracellular concentration falls, and additional sodium begins to diffuse in from the tubule lumen as replacement. The symporter requires chloride to be transported in as well. Water passively follows to maintain isotonicity; excess chloride and potassium passively diffuse out the cell through basolateral channels into the interstitial space, and water accompanies them. The water and chloride, as well as the sodium pumped out by the ATPase, will be absorbed into the bloodstream.

Metolazone and the other thiazide diuretics inhibit the function of the sodium-chloride symporter, preventing sodium and chloride, and therefore water too, from leaving the lumen to enter the tubule cell. As a result, water remains in the lumen and is excreted as urine, instead of being reabsorbed into the bloodstream. Since most of the sodium in the lumen has already been reabsorbed by the time the filtrate reaches the distal convoluted tubule, thiazide diuretics have limited effects on water balance and on electrolyte levels. Nevertheless, they can be associated with low sodium levels, volume depletion, and low blood pressure, among other adverse effects.

== Pharmacokinetics ==
Metolazone is only available in oral preparations. Approximately 65% of the amount ingested becomes available in the bloodstream. Its half-life is approximately fourteen hours, similar to indapamide but considerably longer than hydrochlorothiazide. Metolazone is around ten times as potent as hydrochlorothiazide. The primary form of excretion is in the urine (around 80%); the remaining fifth is evenly split between biliary excretion and metabolism into inactive forms.

== Chemistry ==
The use of activated anthranilic acid derivatives facilitates the preparation of the amides in those cases where the amines are either unreactive or difficult to obtain.

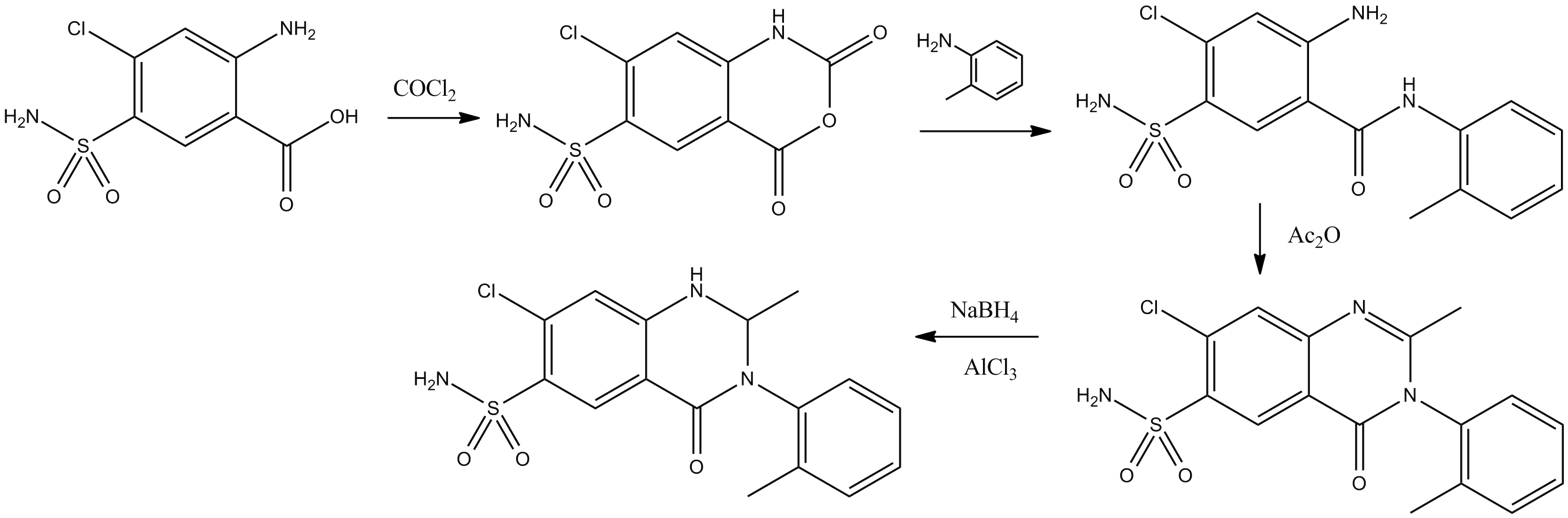
Metolazone center:

Thus, reaction of (1) with phosgene gives the reactive the isatoic anhydride (2). Condensation of that with ortho-toluidine leads to the acylation product (3) formed with a simultaneous loss of carbon dioxide. This is then converted to the quinazolone (4) by heating with acetic anhydride. Reaction with sodium borohydride in the presence of aluminum chloride selectively reduces the double bond to yield the diuretic agent metolazone (5).

=== Structure and classification ===
Metolazone is a quinazoline, a derivative of the similar diuretic quinethazone, as well as a sulfonamide. It is related to analogs of 1,2,4-benzothiadizine-1,1-dioxide (benzothiadiazine). Such drugs are called benzothiadiazides, or thiazides for short; however, in terms of chemistry, metolazone is not a substituted benzothiadiazine, and therefore is not technically a thiazide. Since metolazone (as well as other drugs like indapamide) acts on the same target as thiazides and behave in a similar pharmacologic fashion, it is, however, considered a "thiazide-like diuretic." Therefore, metolazone and similar drugs are often categorized with thiazide diuretics despite not being thiazides themselves.

== History ==
Metolazone was developed in the 1970s. Its creator, Indian born chemist Dr. Bola Vithal Shetty has been active in helping the U.S. Food and Drug Administration review drug applications, and in the development of new medicines. Metolazone quickly gained popularity due to its lower kidney toxicity compared to other diuretics (especially thiazides) in patients with chronic kidney disease.
