= Thiazide =

Class of chemical compounds

- Drug class
- Chlorothiazide, the first thiazide drug

Class identifiers
- Use: hypertension, edema
- ATC code: C03A
- Biological target: sodium-chloride symporter

External links
- MeSH: D049971

Legal status

Benzothiadiazine, the parent structure of this class of molecules

Thiazides (/ˈθaɪəzaɪd/) are a class of diuretics based on the chemical structure of benzothiadiazine. Thiazides are used in the treatment of hypertension. The first approved drug of this class was chlorothiazide in 1958.

Thiazide-like diuretics, such as indapamide, are sometimes called thiazides because they act on the same receptor, but do not have the thiazide chemical structure. The thiazide receptor is a sodium-chloride transporter that pulls NaCl from the lumen in the distal convoluted tubule of the kidneys. Thiazide diuretics inhibit this receptor, causing the body to release NaCl and water into the urine, thereby increasing the amount of urine produced each day.

== Medical uses ==
Thiazide diuretics are primarily used to treat the hypertension (high blood pressure) and edema (swelling) caused by water overload as well as certain conditions related to unbalanced calcium metabolism.

=== Water balance ===
==== Hypertension ====
Thiazides and thiazide-like diuretics are generally recommended amongst other classes as first-line treatment for hypertension (high blood pressure). They have been in use since their introduction in 1958. Low-dose thiazides are more effective at treating hypertension than beta blockers and are similar to ACE inhibitors. Low-dose thiazides are tolerated as well as the other classes of medications for hypertension including ACE inhibitors, beta blockers and calcium channel blockers. In general, the thiazides and thiazide-like diuretics used in hypertension reduce the risk of death, stroke, heart attack and heart failure.

Drug Type	Generic drug name	Threshold between low dose and high dose (mg/day)
Thiazide diuretic	Chlorothiazide	500
Thiazide diuretic	Hydrochlorothiazide	50
Thiazide diuretic	Bendroflumethiazide	5
Thiazide diuretic	Methyclothiazide	5
Thiazide diuretic	Trichlormethiazide	2
Thiazide-like diuretic	Chlorthalidone	50
Thiazide-like diuretic	Indapamide	5

==== Diabetes insipidus ====
Thiazides can be used to paradoxically decrease urine flow in people with nephrogenic diabetes insipidus. Thiazides may also be useful in treating hyponatremia (low blood sodium) in infants with central diabetes insipidus.

=== Calcium balance ===
==== Urinary stones ====
Thiazides are useful in treating kidney stones and bladder stones that result from hypercalciuria (high urine calcium levels). Thiazides increase the uptake of calcium in the distal tubules, to moderately reduce urinary calcium. Thiazides combined with potassium citrate, increased water intake and decreased dietary oxalate and sodium can slow or even reverse the formation of calcium-containing kidney stones. High-dose therapy with the thiazide-like diuretic indapamide can be used to treat idiopathic hypercalcinuria (high urine calcium with unknown cause).

==== Osteoporosis ====
Hypocalcemia (low blood calcium) can be caused by a variety of conditions that reduce dietary calcium absorption, increase calcium excretion or both. Positive calcium balance occurs when calcium excretion is decreased and intake remains constant so that calcium is retained within the body. Higher levels of retained calcium are associated with increased bone mineral density and fewer fractures in individuals with osteoporosis. By a poorly understood mechanism, thiazides directly stimulate osteoblast differentiation and bone mineral formation, further slowing the course of osteoporosis.

==== Dent's disease ====
Thiazides may be used to treat the symptoms of Dent's disease, an X-linked genetic condition that results in electrolyte imbalance with repeated episodes of kidney stones. A case study of two brothers with the condition, two years of treatment with hydrochlorothiazide reduced the incidence of kidney stones and improved kidney function. The thiazide-like diuretic chlortalidone reduced urine calcium oxalate in seven of the eight males with inactivated CLCN5 gene that participated in the study. Inactivation of the CLCN5 gene causes Dent's disease type 1. The rare nature of Dent's disease makes it difficult to coordinate large controlled studies, so most evidence for thiazide use is with too few patients to make broad recommendations possible.

=== Other uses ===
Bromine intoxication can be treated by giving intravenous saline with either thiazides or loop diuretics.

== Contraindications ==
Contraindications include:

- Hypotension
- Allergy to sulphur-containing medications
- Gout
- Lithium therapy
- Hypokalemia
- May worsen diabetes
- Chronic kidney disease: thiazides generally lose their effect at eGFR below 30

Thiazides reduce the clearance of uric acid since they compete for the same transporter, and therefore raise the levels of uric acid in the blood. Hence, they are prescribed with caution in patients with gout or hyperuricemia.

Chronic administration of thiazides is associated with the increase of insulin resistance which can lead to hyperglycemia.

Thiazides can decrease placental perfusion and adversely affect the fetus, so should be avoided in pregnancy.

== Adverse effects ==
Overview of nephron function and where thiazide diuretics act.

- Hypokalemia
  - Thiazide diuretics reduce potassium concentration in blood through two indirect mechanisms: inhibition of sodium-chloride symporter at distal convoluted tubule of a nephron and stimulation of aldosterone that activates Na+/K+-ATPase at collecting duct. Inhibition of sodium-chloride symporter increases availability of sodium and chloride in urine. When the urine reaches the collecting duct, the increase in sodium and chloride availability activates Na+/K+-ATPase, which increases the absorption of sodium and excretion of potassium into the urine. Long term administration of thiazide diuretics reduces total body blood volume. This activates the renin–angiotensin system, stimulates the secretion of aldosterone, thus activating Na+/K+-ATPase, increasing excretion of potassium in urine. Therefore, ACE inhibitor and thiazide combination is used to prevent hypokalemia.
- Hyponatremia
- Hyperuricemia
- Hypercalcemia
- Hyperglycemia
- Hyperlipidemia
- Hypomagnesemia
- Hypocalciuria
- Metabolic alkalosis

== Mechanism of action ==
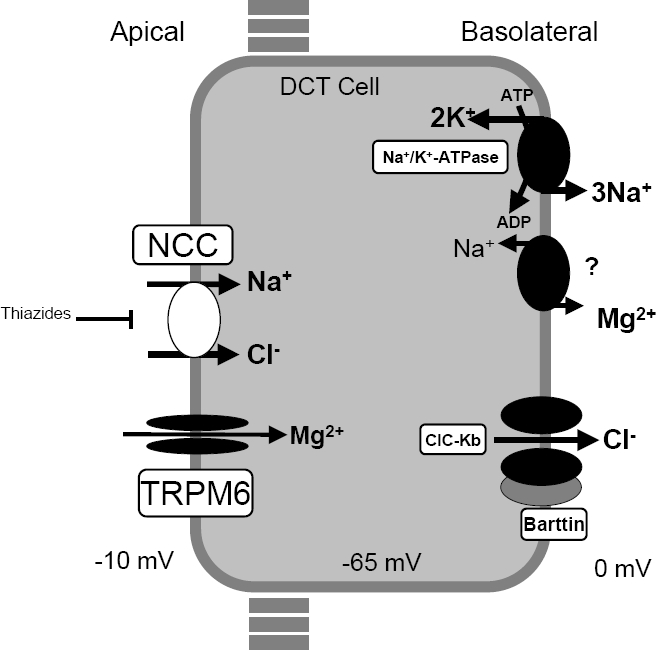
Illustration of the mechanism of action of thiazide diuretics in the distal convoluted tubule of nephrons.

Thiazide diuretics control hypertension in part by inhibiting reabsorption of sodium (Na^{+}) and chloride (Cl^{−}) ions from the distal convoluted tubules in the kidneys by blocking the thiazide-sensitive Na^{+}-Cl^{−} symporter. The term "thiazide" is also often used for drugs with a similar action that do not have the thiazide chemical structure, such as chlorthalidone, metolazone and indapamide. These agents are more properly termed thiazide-like diuretic.

The membrane-associated phospholipase NAPE-PLD (N-acyl phosphatidylethanolamine-specific phospholipase D) of the endocannabinoid system is a renal and extrarenal target of "thiazide-type" (e.g., hydrochlorothiazide) and "thiazide-like" diuretics (e.g., chlorthalidone and indapamide). NAPE-PLD accounts for both their acute (diuresis and accompanying decrease of plasma volume) and chronic (reduction of arterial pressure through vascular dilation) therapeutic effects.

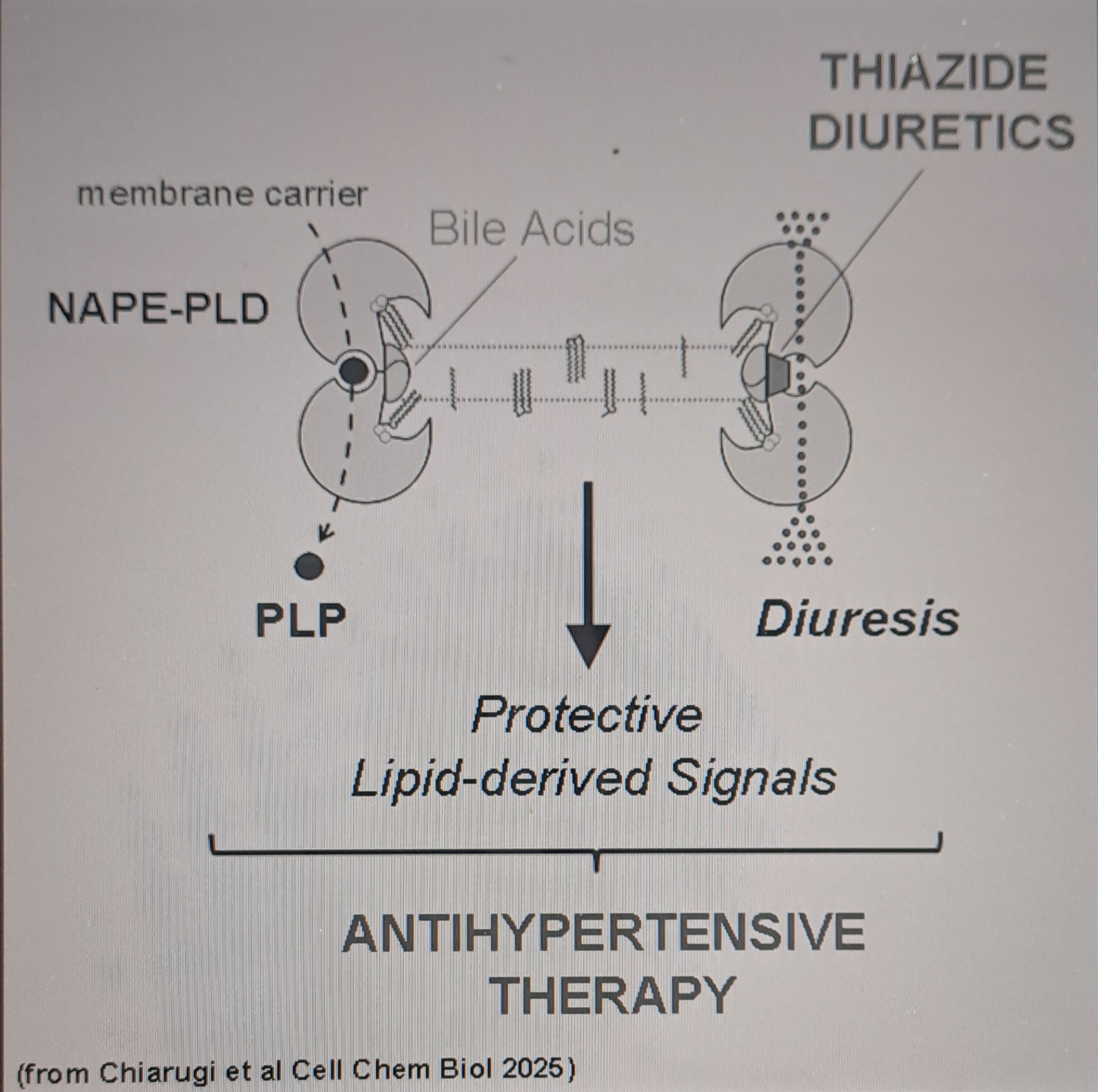
Mechanism of thiazide diuretics mediated systemically by NAPE-PLD

Thiazide diuretics also increase calcium reabsorption at the distal tubule. By lowering the sodium concentration in the tubule epithelial cells, thiazides indirectly increase the activity of the basolateral Na^{+}/Ca^{2+} antiporter to maintain intracellular Na^{+} level, facilitating Ca^{2+} to leave the epithelial cells into the renal interstitium. Thus, intracellular Ca^{2+} concentration is decreased, which allows more Ca^{2+} from the lumen of the tubules to enter epithelial cells via apical Ca^{2+}-selective channels (TRPV5). In other words, less Ca^{2+} in the cell increases the driving force for reabsorption from the lumen.

Thiazides are also thought to increase the reabsorption of Ca^{2+} by a mechanism involving the reabsorption of sodium and calcium in the proximal tubule in response to sodium depletion. Some of this response is due to augmentation of the action of parathyroid hormone.

== Chemistry ==
Thiazides are organic molecules with bi-cyclic structures that contain adjacent sulfur and nitrogen atoms on one ring. The molecule class thiazides are based on the chemical structure of benzothiadiazine.

Confusion sometimes occurs because thiazide-like diuretics such as indapamide are referred to as thiazides despite not having the thiazide chemical structure. When used this way, "thiazide" refers to a drug which acts at the thiazide receptor. The thiazide receptor is a sodium-chloride transporter that pulls NaCl from the lumen in the distal convoluted tubule of the kidneys. Thiazide diuretics inhibit this receptor, causing the body to release NaCl and water into the urine, thereby increasing the amount of urine produced each day. An example of a molecule that is chemically a thiazide but not used as a diuretic is methylchloroisothiazolinone, often found as an antimicrobial in cosmetics.

== Breastfeeding ==
Thiazides pass into breast milk and can decrease the flow of breast milk. Thiazides have been associated with significant side effects in some nursing infants and should be administered to nursing mothers with caution.

== History ==
The thiazide diuretics were developed by scientists Karl H. Beyer, James M. Sprague, John E. Baer, and Frederick C. Novello of Merck and Co. in the 1950s, and led to the marketing of the first drug of this class, chlorothiazide, under the trade name Diuril in 1958. The research leading to the discovery of chlorothiazide was recognized by a special Public Health Award from the Lasker Foundation in 1975.
