= Acropachy =

Skin disorder associated with Graves' disease

- Other names: Thyroid acropachy
- This condition is inherited in an autosomal recessive manner
- Specialty: Endocrinology, dermatology, orthopedic surgery

Acropachy is a dermopathy associated with Graves' disease. It is characterized by soft-tissue swelling of the hands and clubbing of the fingers. Radiographic imaging of affected extremities typically demonstrates periostitis, most commonly the metacarpal bones. The exact cause is unknown, but it is thought to be caused by stimulating auto-antibodies that are implicated in the pathophysiology of Graves' thyrotoxicosis. There is no effective treatment for acropachy.

Since it is closely associated with Graves' disease, it is associated with other manifestations of Graves' disease, such as Graves' ophthalmopathy and thyroid dermopathy.

Hereditary acropachy (also known as "isolated congenital nail clubbing") may be associated with HPGD.

== See also ==
- Periosteal reaction
