= Thiazide-like diuretic =

Class of drugs which promote urine production

A thiazide-like diuretic is a sulfonamide diuretic that has similar physiological properties to a thiazide diuretic, but does not have the chemical properties of a thiazide, lacking the benzothiadiazine molecular structure. Examples include metolazone, chlorthalidone, and indapamide.
