= Idiopathic hypercalcinuria =

High calcium in urine

Idiopathic hypercalcinuria (IH) is a condition including an excessive urinary calcium level with a normal blood calcium level resulting from no underlying cause. IH has become the most common cause of hypercalciuria and is the most serious metabolic risk factor for developing nephrolithiasis. IH can predispose individuals to osteopenia or osteoporosis, and affects the entire body. IH arises due to faulty calcium homeostasis, a closely monitored process, where slight deviations in calcium transport in the intestines, blood, and bone can lead to excessive calcium excretion, bone mineral density loss, or kidney stone formation. 50%-60% of nephrolithiasis patients suffer from IH and have 5%-15% lower bone density than those who do not.

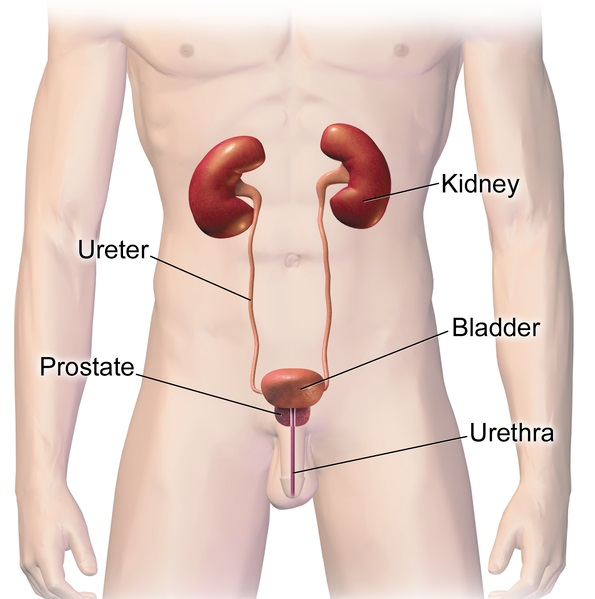
Anatomy of the male urinary system.

The standard definition of hypercalciuria is varied. Hodkinson and Pyrah proposed hypercalciuria as a calcium excretion of over 7.5 mmol in men and 6.25 mmol in women, every 24 hours, but some argue that these values are too restrictive and ignore age, weight considerations, and renal function. Calcium excretion is negatively associated with age until the ages of 30–60, where calcium excretion starts increasing. Calcium excretion begins decreasing following age 60. Other suggested IH be considered a daily urinary excretion of >4 mg of calcium per kg of body weight, making it more applicable among different age groups and weight classes.

IH shares many similarities with hyperparathyroidism, a condition associated with the elevated release of parathyroid hormone from the parathyroid gland. The only discernable feature between the two is the normal blood calcium level associated with IH.

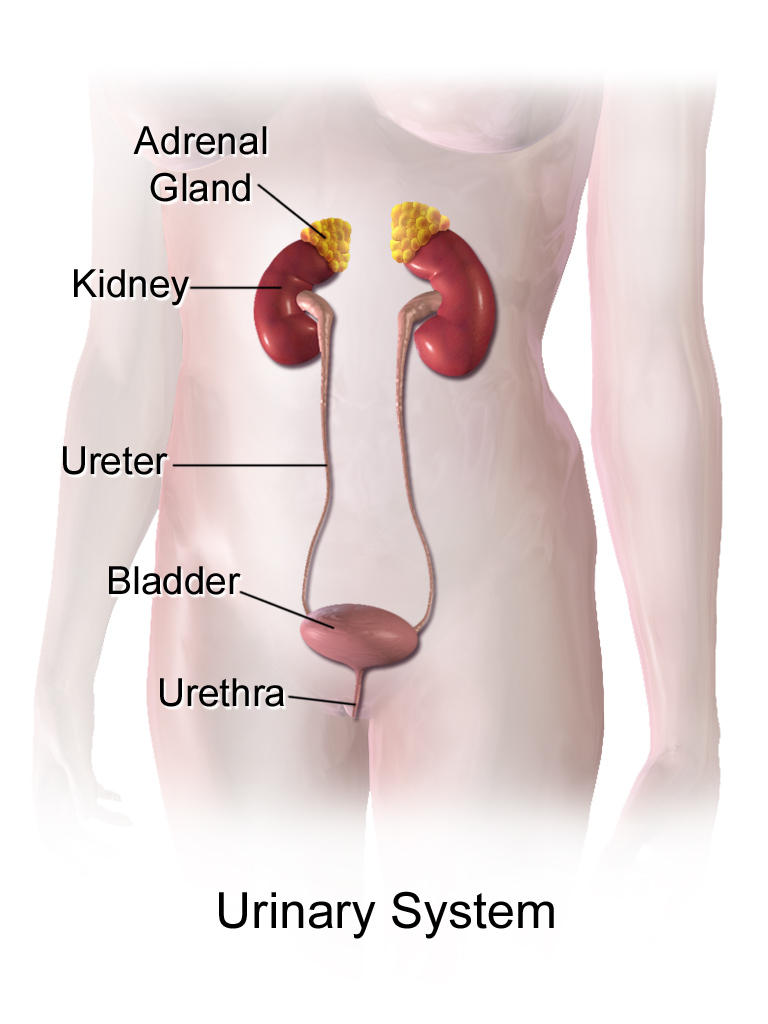
Anatomy of the female urinary system.

== Signs and symptoms ==
IH can be presented with many urinary associated signs and symptoms mostly seen in children. They include:

- Urinary incontinence, pollakiuria, and nocturnal enuresis
- Kidney stones and lithiasis
- Urinary tract infection (UTI)
- Hematuria, sterile leukocyturia and discrete proteinuria
- Dysuria and chronic abdominal pain

== Causes ==
It has been hypothesized that three mechanisms contribute to IH: increased calcium absorption in the intestines, faulty renal tubule calcium reabsorption in the kidneys, and an increased rate of bone resorption. Others estimate IH may arise due to excessive expression of vitamin D receptors. (VDR) or a deficiency in enzymes within the renal tubules.

=== Increased intestinal calcium absorption ===
A study found that patients with IH have a rate of calcium absorption two times that of healthy individuals, and have elevated levels of calcitriol. Calcium is absorbed through intestinal walls, majorly in the duodenum and to a lower degree in the small intestines and the colon, via two transport systems, a vitamin dependent mechanism and a vitamin independent mechanism. Within the vitamin-dependent mechanism, 1, 25 Dihydroxyvitamin D is responsible for increasing intestinal calcium absorption, which was found elevated in certain IH patients, yet remained normal in others, suggesting other factors resulted in the increased calcium absorption. The increased expression of VDR in the intestinal walls may result in this.

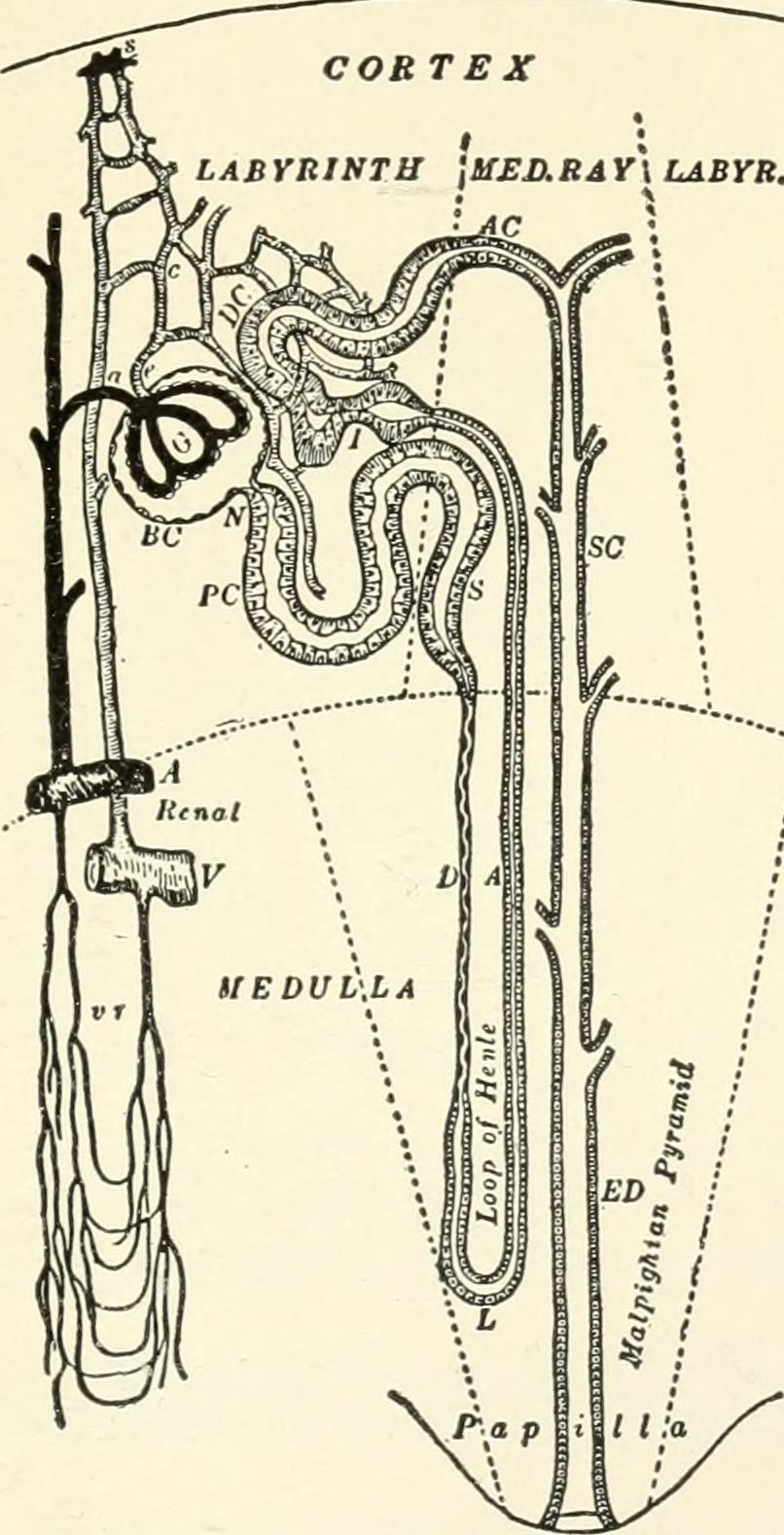
A diagram of the renal tubules beginning with the glomerulus, then the proximal tubules, the loop of Henle, the distal tubules and the collecting duct.

=== Faulty renal tubule calcium reabsorption ===
The renal tubules are an important factor in the reabsorption of substances, including glucose, sodium, chloride, and calcium. The renal tubules consist of the proximal tubule, the loop of Henle, the distal tubule and the collecting duct. The glomerulus lies ahead of the renal tubules. Calcium is filtered out of the blood in the glomerulus, and 60% of the calcium is reabsorbed in the proximal tubules, compared to 25% in the loop of Henle, specifically the thick ascending limb. The distal convoluted tubule and the collecting duct monitor the reabsorption of the remaining calcium. Significantly low levels of calcium reabsorption were found in patients with IH, suggesting a modification or defect is present in one of the absorptive pathways used by the renal tubules. This can possibly due to less parathyroid hormone release, a key regulator in maintaining calcium reabsorption, or a renal tubule enzyme deficiency, believed to affect the ascending portion of the loop of Henle and the distal tubule. The exact mechanism remains unknown.

=== Increased rate of bone resorption ===
It was found that IH patients had lower bone density, suggesting increased bone resorption. Bone resorption involves the breaking down of bone tissue and the transfer of calcium ions into the blood. Bone resorption is carried out by specialized bone cells known as osteoclasts. A surge in osteoclast activity can lead to hypercalciuria, as more bone tissue is broken down, meaning more calcium is released into the blood. Histomorphometry studies failed to discover a significant difference in bone volume in IH patients and only found a lower rate of bone formation, yet this is contradicted in other studies.

The mechanism behind how hypercalciuria causes increased bone resorption is still conflicting. A high animal protein diet causes increased bone resorption and bone loss rate. The high level of calcitriol found in hypercalciuria patients mentioned earlier stimulates higher rates of bone resorption and lowers bone formation. Unrestrained amounts of interleukin-1, TNF-α, and GM-CSF released from monocytes were found in hypercalciuria patients, which are key determinants in bone remodelling efficiency, furthering bone density loss.

=== Genetic ===
IH has been considered a disorder affected by both environmental and genetic factors and has a heterogeneous pathogenesis. It was also found to differ based on family characteristics, and have a familial distribution.

It was found that 43% of first-degree relatives and 36% of second-degree relatives of patients with hypercalciuria among nine families had IH. IH is believed to have an autosomal dominant transmission pattern, as it was not correlated with gender and was observed in all generations. Pak et al. and Nicolaidou et al. identified the same pattern. Additionally, different hypercalciuria forms within a family were discovered in Lerolle et al., confirming an autosomal dominant transmission.

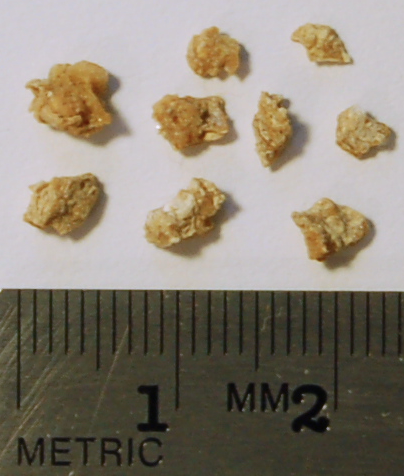
Kidney stone fragments formed from calcium oxalate.

== Risk factors ==
Calcium levels in the urine can be affected by multiple systems in the body including the digestive system, endocrine system, and skeletal system, to which faulty mechanisms can lead to possible risk factors for IH. Most IH cases have no one direct cause, and involve a flaw in more than one system.

One risk factor for IH is excessive vitamin D consumption in the diet or taking medicine which disrupts the calcium regulating mechanisms. Such medications may include furosemide which enhances calcium excreted by urine, corticosteroids which reduce the body's ability to absorb calcium, and methylxanthines which stimulate calcium transportation. An example of a methylxanthine is theophylline.

Excessive vitamin D intake can lead to an overexpression of vitamin D receptors (VDR) causing an elevated serum level of 1,25-dihydroxyvitamin D3 [1,25(OH)2D3], or calcitriol. An elevated level of 1,25-dihydroxyvitamin D3 stimulates more absorption of calcium in the intestines.

A diet high in sodium and protein further increases the risk of IH. Excessive protein intake may be associated with an enlarged kidney and the overproduction of calcitriol that acts on calcium absorption, causing more excretion of calcium in the urine.

Insufficient water or fluid intake also acts as a risk factor. Lowered water concentration leads to a higher calcium oxalate and calcium phosphate concentration. This supersaturation process leads to higher calcium level excreted through urine.

== Diagnosis ==
Diagnosis for IH includes differential diagnosis and diagnostic methods. Differential diagnosis is made to exclude conditions possibly contributing to the increased urinary calcium levels, by looking for apparent causes through interviews, physical examinations, and dietary recall.

Diagnostic methods are done to measure protein and calcium levels. Increased levels of protein in the urine, proteinuria, can be measured with a urine dipstick test. Three different tests may be used to measure calcium levels in urine, 24-hour urine tests, blood tests, and genetic tests. Measuring calcium levels can also be done using an oral calcium tolerance test. Ultrasound and CT scans of the urinary tract can be done to diagnose kidney stones or kidney abnormalities as IH often accompanies it.

=== Urine test ===
Urine tests are routinely done to analyse the composition of urine for the detection of calcium nephrolithiasis. In urine tests, patients are given a week of restricted calcium diet, and their urine samples are collected for two days to assay calcium in the urine. Urine tests with hypercalciuria should result in a 0.2 mg/mg ratio between calcium and creatinine. If calcium excreted in urine is measured to be lower than 0.07 mmol/kg after 24 hours, diet-dependent hypercalciuria can be deduced, and sodium levels in urine can confirm the result. If the test results come back standard but hypercalciuria continues, the patient can be diagnosed with IH.

=== Blood tests ===
Since children diagnosed with hematuria are generally also tested for hypercalciuria, blood tests in urine are performed to rule out diseases, such as hematuria that may be underlying the cause of hypercalciuria.

=== Genetic tests ===
Various genetic studies such as genome-wide linkage analysis can be done to search for the genes contributing to IH. A few genes possibly associated with IH were selected for genetic screening, including VDR, TRPV5, CasR, and NPT2a. IH is also associated with many monogenic disorders, whether or not renal calcification is involved. The most studied disease is Dent's disease, which is attributed to a mutation in CLCN5 or OCRL1 genes. However, IH patients have not been detected to carry the CLCN5 mutation.

== Treatment ==
=== Diet intervention ===
The objective of treating IH is preventing nephrolithiasis or the formation of kidney stones. If blood calcium levels are normal, which can rule out hyperparathyroidism, treatment would begin with adopting a diet of ~800 mg of daily calcium, low salt intake, restricted animal protein intake, and increased net fluid intake. Careful dietary decisions should be taken since a deficient calcium intake diet accompanies the risk of excessive bone loss and can increase the absorption of dietary oxalates, found in many leafy greens and vegetables, which combine with calcium in the intestines, and form oxalate kidney stones. The diet's effectiveness can be determined by repeating a 24-hour urine test.

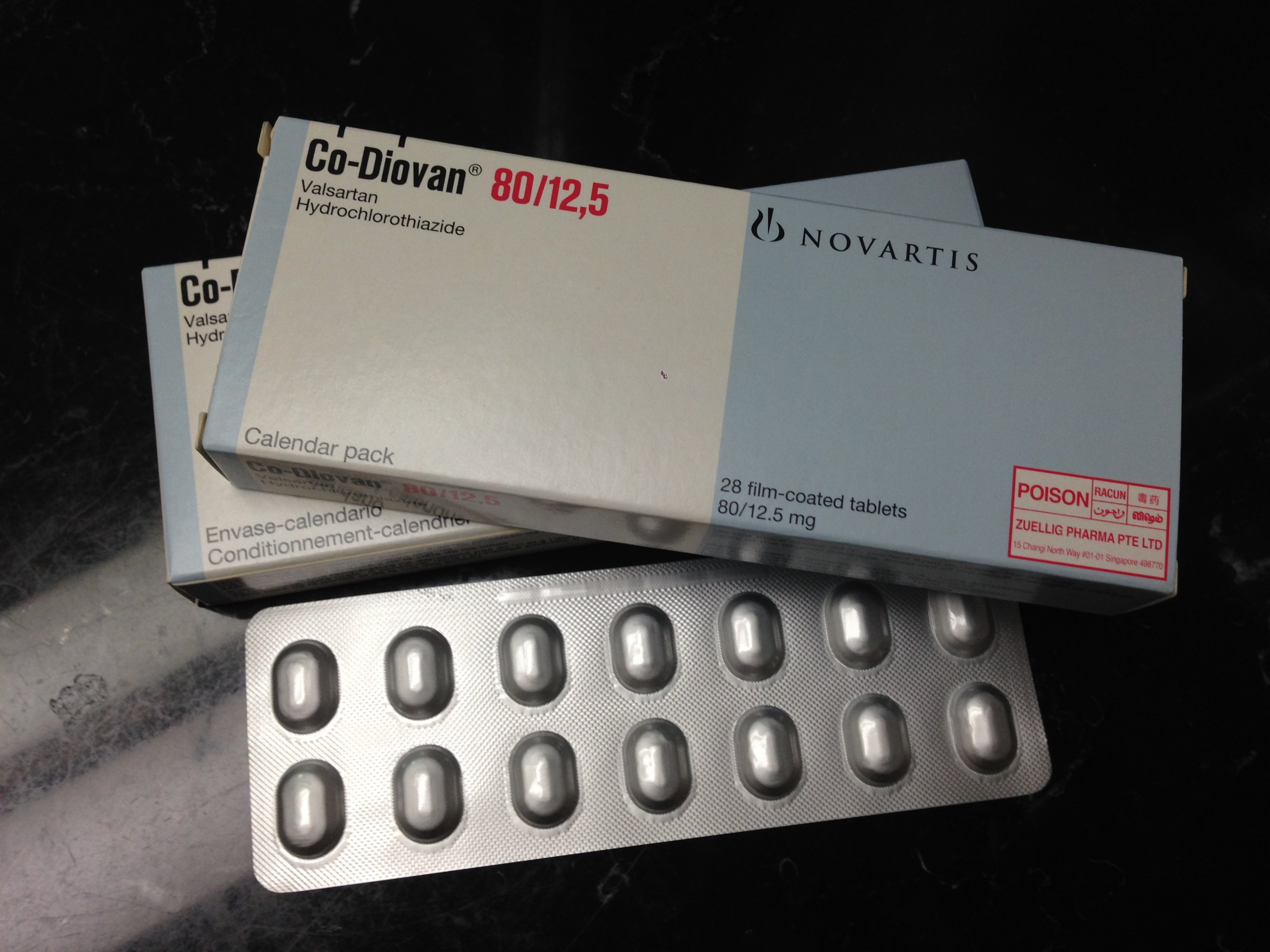
Co-Diovan (Valsartan and hydrochlorothiazide) used as a pharmacuteical intervention for hypertension in adults by increasing the amount of urine produced.

=== Pharmaceutical intervention ===
If hypercalciuria persists following dietary intervention, pharmaceutical interventions are used, primarily thiazide diuretics. Thiazide therapy has proven effective in preventing the formation of kidney stones, reducing urinary calcium, and preventing the periodic occurrence of nephrolithiasis. Thiazides lessen urinary citrate excretion and blood potassium levels, making it recommended to prescribe potassium citrate alongside thiazide therapy. A thiazide option includes Hydrochlorothiazide. A study found that hydrochlorothiazide cleared hypercalciuria and increased spine and hip bone density. Another option would be to use chlorthalidone or indapamide.

Pharmaceutical interventions should only be made an option succeeding various months of following diet therapy, and a low sodium diet must be maintained throughout the use of thiazide diuretics. If Thiazide therapy fails even after combining it with an appropriate diet, oral orthophosphates are the final recommended treatment.

== Complications ==
If left untreated, hypercalciuria can cause the following complications:

=== Nephrolithiasis ===
Nephrolithiasis is the medical term employing kidney stone formation. The increased saturation of urine with calcium elevates the rate of stone formation within the kidneys, due to the excess calcium precipitating and forming crystals, which develop into larger stones over time. The stones form in the kidneys and leave the body through the urethra, which can cause tremendous amounts of pain.

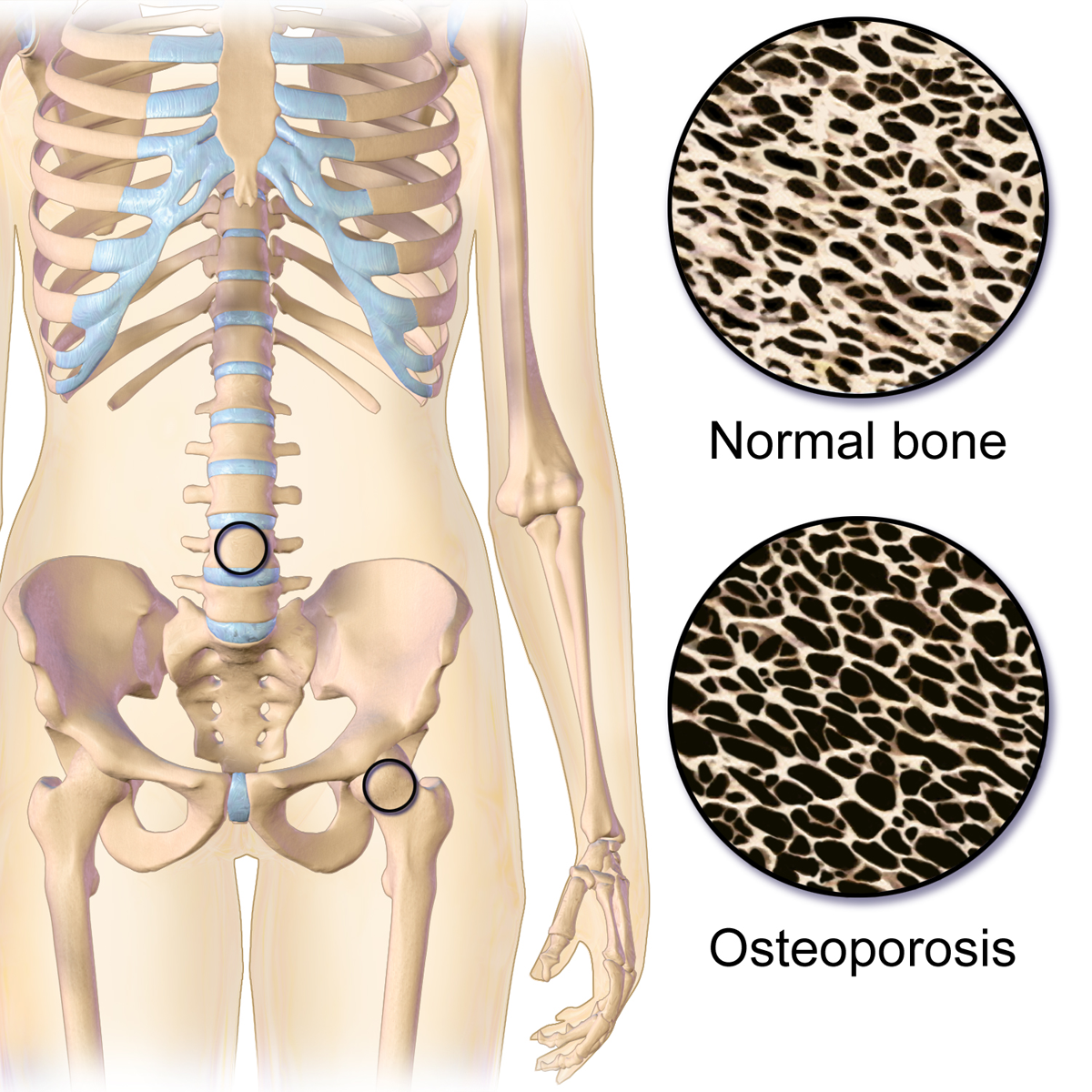
The difference in bone composition between normal bone and an osteoporosis affected bone in common locations of osteoporosis in IH patients.

=== Osteopenia or Osteoporosis ===
The increased rate of bone resorption causing higher serum calcium levels could lead to osteopenia, or osteoporosis, where bones are excessively thin to the point they fracture easily. Increased fracture risk was identified in nephrolithiasis patients, yet no data directly condemns hypercalciuria for this discovery. Bone loss is unique to nephroliths patients with IH, proposing it has an unidentified role in the increased bone fragility and fracture risk in these patients.

=== Recurrent urinary tract infections (UTI) ===
The high urinary calcium levels in IH impair the function of the uroepithelium within the urinary tract, which acts as our body's defence mechanism against bacteria. It coordinates the inflammatory response and the release of antibodies. The uroepithelium must be in physical contact the bacteria to initiate a defence mechanism, but the calcium-oxalate crystals formed in IH prevent this and prevent the elimination of bacteria by excretion and increases the chance of developing UTIs.
