= Pachydermoperiostosis =

Rare genetic disorder that affects bones and skin

- Other names: Primary hypertrophic osteoarthropathy
- Specialty: Rheumatology

Pachydermoperiostosis (PDP) is a rare genetic disorder that affects both bones and skin. Other names are primary hypertrophic osteoarthropathy or Touraine-Solente-Golé syndrome. It is mainly characterized by pachyderma (thickening of the skin), periostosis (excessive bone formation) and finger clubbing (swelling of tissue with loss of normal angle between nail and nail bed).

This disease affects more men than women. After onset, the disease stabilizes after about 5–20 years. Life of PDP patients can be severely impaired. Currently, symptomatic treatments are NSAIDs and steroids or surgical procedures.

In 1868, PDP was first described by Friedreich as 'excessive growth of bone of the entire skeleton'. Touraine, Solente and Golé described PDP as the primary form of bone disease hypertrophic osteoarthropathy in 1935 and distinguished its three known forms.

== Symptoms and signs ==
PDP has a number of visible signs. Most important clinical features are: pachydermia (thickening and wrinkling of the skin), furrowing of the face and scalp, periostosis (swelling of periarticular tissue and shaggy periosteal new bone formation of long bones) and digital clubbing (enlargement of fingertips). Other features include excessive sweating, arthralgia and gastrointestinal abnormalities. An overview of all symptoms is provided in table 2.

Table 2. Overview of signs

Skin features	Pachydermia
	Coarse skin
	Oily skin
	Eczema
	Thick hand and foot skin
	Leonine facies
	Furrowing
	Cutis verticis gyrate
	Increased secretion of sebum
	Sebborheic hyperplasia
	Keloid formation
Bone features	Periostosis
	Acroosteolysis
	Mylefibrosis
	Thick toe and finger bones
	Widening of bone formation
Clubbing	Digital clubbing
Sweating	Hyperhidrosis
Eye features	Drooping eyelids
	Thick stratum corneum
Joints	Arthralgia
	Joint effusion
Muscles	Muscle discomfort
Hair	Decreased facial and pubic hair
Vascular	Peripheral vascular stasis
Gastrointestinal involvement	Peptic ulcer
	Chronic gastritis
	Crohn's disease

== Cause ==
The locally acting mediator prostaglandin E_{2} (PGE_{2}) plays a role in the pathogenesis of PDP. In PDP patients, high levels of PGE_{2} and decreased levels of PGE-M (the metabolite of PGE_{2}) were observed.

PGE_{2} can mimic the activity of osteoblasts and osteoclasts (respectively building and breaking down bone tissue). This is why acroosteolysis and periosteal bone formation can be explained by the action of PGE_{2}. Furthermore, PGE_{2} has vasodilatory effects, which is consistent with prolonged local vasodilation in digital clubbing.

Elevated levels of PGE_{2} in PDP patients are associated with mutations of HPGD gene. These patients showed typical PDP symptoms such as digital clubbing and periostosis. The HPGD gene is mapped on chromosome 4q34 and encodes the enzyme HPGD (15-hydroxyprostaglandin dehydrogenase). This enzyme catalyzes the first step in the degradation of PGE_{2} and related eicosanoids. So far, eight different mutations are known leading to a dysfunctional HPGD enzyme in PDP patients. Due to these mutations, the binding of the substrate PGE_{2} to HPGD is disrupted. As a result of this, PGE_{2} cannot be transferred into PGE-M down and remain present at high concentrations.

=== Role of other mediators ===
Apart from elevated PGE_{2} levels, studies in patients with hypertrophic osteoarthropathy also showed increased plasma levels of several other mediators, such as Von Willebrand factor and vascular endothelial growth factor (VEGF). These substances could also have a role in PDP progression and proliferation. In contrast to HPGD mutations, suspected mutations for these factors have not been reported yet.

Von Willebrand factor is a marker of platelet and endothelial activation. This suggests that the activation of endothelial cells and platelets play an important role in the pathogenesis of PDP. VEGF promotes angiogenesis (growth of new blood vessels) and differentiation of osteoblasts, which can explain the clubbing and excessive fibroblast formation in PDP patients. Other mediators found in increased concentrations in PDP patients, include osteocalcin, endothelin-1, b-thromboglobulin, platelet-derived growth factor (PDGF) and epidermal growth factor (EGF). It has not been described yet what role these mediators have in PDP.

== Genetics ==
Two genes have been associated with this condition: hydroxyprostaglandin dehydrogenase 15-(NAD) (HPGD) in chromosome 4 (4q34.1) and solute carrier organic anion transporter family member 2A1 (SLCO2A1) in chromosome 3 (3q22.1-q22.2). This syndrome occurs if both copies of either gene are mutated (autosomal recessive inheritance)

== Diagnosis ==
The easiest way to diagnose PDP is when pachydermia, finger clubbing and periostosis of the long bones are present. New bone formation under the periosteum can be detected by radiographs of long bones. In order diagnose PDP, often other diseases must be excluded. For example, to exclude secondary hypertrophic osteoarthropathy, any signs of cardiovascular, pulmonary, hepatic, intestinal and mediastinal diseases must be absent. MRI and ultrasound also have characterictic findings.

Skin biopsy is another way to diagnose PDP. However, it is not a very specific method, because other diseases share the same skin alterations with PDP, such as myxedema and hypothyroidism. In order to exclude these other diseases, hormonal studies are done. For example, thyrotropin and growth hormone levels should be examined to exclude thyroid acropachy and acromegaly. However, skin biopsy helps to diagnose PDP in patients without skin manifestations.

When clubbing is observed, it is helpful to check whether acroosteolysis of distal phalanges of fingers is present. This is useful to diagnose PDP, because the combination of clubbing and acroosteolysis is only found in PDP and Cheney's syndrome.

=== Biomarkers and mutation analysis ===
Since elevated PGE_{2} levels are correlated with PDP, urinary PGE_{2} can be a useful biomarker for this disease. Additionally, HPGD mutation analyses are relatively cheap and simple and may prove to be useful in early investigation in patients with unexplained clubbing or children presenting PDP-like features. Early positive results can prevent expensive and longtime tests at identifying the pathology.

For the follow-up of PDP disease activity, bone formation markers such as TAP, BAP, BGP, carbodyterminal propeptide of type I procollagen or NTX can play an important role. Other biomarkers that can be considered are IL-6 and receptor activator of NF-κB ligand (RANKL), which are associated with increased bone resorption in some patients. However, further investigation is needed to confirm this use of disease monitoring.

PGE_{2} may also be raised in patients with lung cancer and finger clubbing. This may be related to raised levels of cyclooxygenase-2, an enzyme involved in the metabolism of prostaglandins. A similar association has been noted in cystic fibrosis.

=== Classification ===
PDP is one of the two types of hypertrophic osteoarthropathy. It represents approximately 5% of the total hypertrophic osteoarthropathy cases. The other form is secondary hypertrophic osteoarthropathy (SHO). SHO usually has an underlying disease (such as cardiopulmonary diseases, malignancies or paraneoplastic syndrome). Unlike SHO, PDP does not have an underlying disease or malignancy.

PDP can be divided into three categories:

- The complete form occurs in 40% of the cases and can involve all the symptoms but mainly pachydermia, periostosis and finger clubbing. This is also referred to as the full-blown phenotype.
- The incomplete form occurs in 54% of the cases and is characterized by having mainly effect on the bones and thereby the skeletal changes. Its effect on the skin (causing for instance pachydermia) is very limited.
- The fruste form occurs in only 6% of the cases and is the opposite of the incomplete form. Minor skeletal changes are found, and mostly cutaneous symptoms are observed with limited periostosis.

The cause of these differentiating pathologies is still unknown.

== Treatment ==
The effective treatment for PDP is currently unknown due to the lack of controlled data and is largely based on case reports. Although the HPGD enzyme is likely to be involved into the pathogenesis of PDP, no strategies against this mutation have been reported yet, since it is hard to tackle a defective enzyme. Gene therapy could be a solution for this, although this has not been reported yet in literature.

Conventional PDP drug treatment to decrease inflammation and pain includes NSAIDs and corticosteroids. Other drugs used by PDP patients target bone formation or skin manifestations. Surgical care is used to improve cosmetic appearance.

=== Inflammation and pain drug treatment ===
Non-steroidal anti-inflammatory drugs (NSAIDs) and corticosteroids are most used in PDP treatment. These drugs inhibit cyclo-oxygenase activity and thereby prostaglandin synthesis. Since PGE_{2} is likely to be involved in periosteal bone formation and acroosteolysis, this is why these drugs can alleviate the polyarthritis associated with PDP. In addition, NSAIDs and corticosteroids decrease formation of inflammatory mediators, reducing inflammation and pain. In case of possible gastropathy, the COX-2 selective NSAID etorixocib is preferred.

Infliximab can reduce pain and arthritis in PDP. It is a monoclonal antibody that blocks the biological action of TNF-α (tumor necrosis factor-alpha). TNF-α is an inflammatory cytokine found in high levels in PDP and it is involved in the production of other inflammatory mediators which increase the expression of RANKL. RANKL is thought to increase bone resorption.

=== Bone formation and pain drug treatment ===
Rheumatologic symptoms can be improved by treatment with bisphosphonates, such as pamidronate or risedronate. Bisphosphonates inhibit osteoclastic bone resorption and therefore reduce bone remodeling and alleviate painful polyarthritis.

In isolated cases, tamoxifen was effective in PDP treatment, especially for bone and joint pain. In PDP patients, high levels of nuclear receptors were found for steroids, which was the rationale to use tamoxifen, an estrogen receptor antagonist. Tamoxifen and several of its metabolites competitively bind to estrogen receptors on tissue targets, producing a nuclear complex that decreases DNA synthesis. Cells are accumulated in G_{0} and G_{1} phases. In vitro studies showed that tamoxifen acts as an estrogen agonist on bone and inhibits the resorbing activity of osteoclasts (disruption of bone tissue).

=== Skin manifestations drug treatment ===
Retinoids are used to improve skin manifestations. Retinoids can act on retinoid nuclear receptors and thus regulate transcription. For example, isotretinoin, the most effective drug to treat acne, improves cosmetic features by inducing apoptosis within human sebaceous glands. As a result of this, the increase of connective tissue and hyperplasia of the sebaceous glands is inhibited. Retinoids also decrease procollagen mRNA in fibroblasts, improving pachyderma.

Like retinoids, colchicines can also improve skin manifestations. It is able to bind to the ends of microtubules to prevent its elongation. Because microtubules are involved in cell division, signal transduction and regulation of gene expression, colchicine can inhibit cell division and inflammatory processes (e.g. action of neutrophils and leukocytes). It is suggested that colchicine inhibit chemotactic activity of leukocytes, which leads to reduction of pachydermia.

Use of botulinum toxin type A (BTX-A) improved leonine facies of patients. BTX-A inhibits release of acetylcholine acting at the neuromuscular junction. Furthermore, it blocks cholinergic transmission to the sweat glands and therefore inhibits sweat secretion. However, the exact mechanism for improving leonine faces is unknown and needs to be further investigated.

=== Surgical Care ===
Aside from drug treatments, there are many surgical methods to improve the facial appearance. One of them is facelift, technically known as facial rhytidectomy. This method is a type of cosmetic surgery procedure used to give a more youthful appearance. It involves the removal of excess facial skin and tightening of the skin on the face and neck. A second option is plastic surgery. This is also used for eye drooping.

== Prognosis ==
The age of onset is often in puberty. Of the described cases, as high as 80% of the affected individuals were suffering from the disease prior to the age of 18. However, Latos-Bielenska et al. stated that this percentage should be lower, because another form of osteoarthropathy – familial idiopathic osteoarthropathy (FIO) - was also taken into account in this analysis.

PDP usually progresses for 5 to 20 years, until it becomes stable. Life expectancy may be normal, despite patients getting many functional and cosmetic complications, including restricted motion, neurologic manifestations and leonine facies.

== Epidemiology ==
=== Prevalence ===
PDP is a rare genetic disease. At least 204 cases of PDP have been reported. The precise incidence and prevalence of PDP are still unknown. A prevalence of 0.16% was suggested by Jajic et Jajic.

=== Distribution ===
PDP occurs more frequently in men than in women (ratio around 7:1). Moreover, men suffer from more severe symptoms (see table 1). African American people are affected to a higher extent.

Table 1. Distribution of different forms of PDP among 201 reported affected men and women (167 men and 34 women).

Form of PDP	Sex	
	Men	Women
Complete	45%	18%
Incomplete	50%	71%
Fruste	5%	12%

=== Heredity ===
In 25-38% of the cases, patients have a familial history of PDP. It is suggested that the incomplete form and complete form are inherited in different ways: either autosomal dominant inheritance (involving a dominant allele) or autosomal recessive inheritance (involving a recessive allele).

The autosomal dominant model of inheritance with penetrance and variable expression is confirmed in about half of the families, associated with the incomplete form. Of several families, an autosomal recessive model of inheritance is known, associated with the complete form with much more severe symptoms involving joint, bone and skin features. Male-female ratio in PDP is skewed towards males.

Two genes have been associated with this condition: hydroxyprostaglandin dehydrogenase 15-(NAD) (HPGD) and solute carrier organic anion transporter family, member 2A1/prostaglandin transporter (SLCO2A1). The underlying pathophysiology appears to be an abnormality of prostglandin E2 but the details have yet to be elucidated.

== Society ==
Six patient organizations facilitate support for PDP patients. Four of them are situated in Europe (Finland, France, Greece, and Poland). The other two are located in Australia and Morocco (the Association Marocaine des Génodermatoses).
