= Marie's disease =

Marie's Disease may refer to:

- Ankylosing spondylitis
- Hypertrophic pulmonary osteoarthropathy
