= HOA =

HOA or Hoa may refer to:

== Arts ==
- Hardwell On Air, a Dutch radio programme
- House of Anubis, a television drama series
- Hands of Asclepius, a fictional organization in the video game Trauma Center: Under the Knife 2

== Languages ==
- ǂHõã language (ISO 639: huc), a Khoisan language of Botswana
- Hoava language (ISO 639: hoa), an Oceanic language of the Solomon Islands

== Law and government ==
- Heads of agreement (law)
- Homeowner association, a private association-like entity
- House of Assembly, the name of several current and former national and sub-national legislatures

== Science and technology ==
- Higher-order Ambisonics, a full-sphere surround sound Ambisonics technique
- Hypertrophic osteopathy, a bone disease secondary to cancer in the lungs

== Other uses ==
- Hoa people, an Overseas Chinese minority group residing in Vietnam
- Hora oficial argentina, see Time in Argentina
- Horn of Africa (HoA), a peninsula in East Africa
- hoa, a title for Muisca rulers
