= Schamroth =

Schamroth is a surname. Notable people with this surname include:

- Helen Schamroth (born 1940s), Polish-New Zealand craft artist and author
- Leo Schamroth (1924–1988), South African cardiologist
