= Enteropathy =

- Specialty: Gastroenterology

Enteropathy refers to any pathology of the intestine. Although enteritis specifically refers to an inflammation of the intestine, and is thus a more specific term than "enteropathy", the two terms are sometimes used interchangeably.

== Types ==
Specific types of enteropathy include:

- Enteropathy-associated T-cell lymphoma
- Environmental enteropathy, also known as tropical enteropathy

An incompletely defined syndrome of inflammation related to the quality of the environment. Signs and symptoms include reduced absorptive capacity and reduced intestinal barrier function of the small intestine. It is widespread among children and adults in low- and middle-income countries.

- Eosinophilic enteropathy

A condition in which eosinophils (a type of white blood cell) accumulate in the gastrointestinal tract and in the blood. Eosinophil build up in the gastrointestinal tract can result in polyp formation, tissue break down, inflammation, and ulcers.

- Coeliac disease

A malabsorption syndrome precipitated by the ingestion of foods containing gluten in a predisposed individual. It is characterized by inflammation of the small intestine, loss of microvilli structure, deficient nutrient absorption, and malnutrition.

- Human immunodeficiency virus (HIV) enteropathy

Characterized by chronic diarrhea more than one month in duration with no obvious infectious cause in an HIV-positive individual. Thought to be due to direct or indirect effects of HIV on the enteric mucosa.

- Immunodysregulation polyendocrinopathy and enteropathy, X-linked (IPEX syndrome, see FOXP3)
- Protein losing enteropathy
- Radiation enteropathy
- Chronic enteropathy associated with SLCO2A1 gene

If the condition also involves the stomach, it is known as "gastroenteropathy".

In pigs, porcine proliferative enteropathy is a diarrheal disease.
