= Nail clubbing =

Deformity of the finger or toe nails

Clubbing
- Other names: Drumstick fingers/toes, Hippocratic fingers/toes, digital clubbing, watch-glass nails
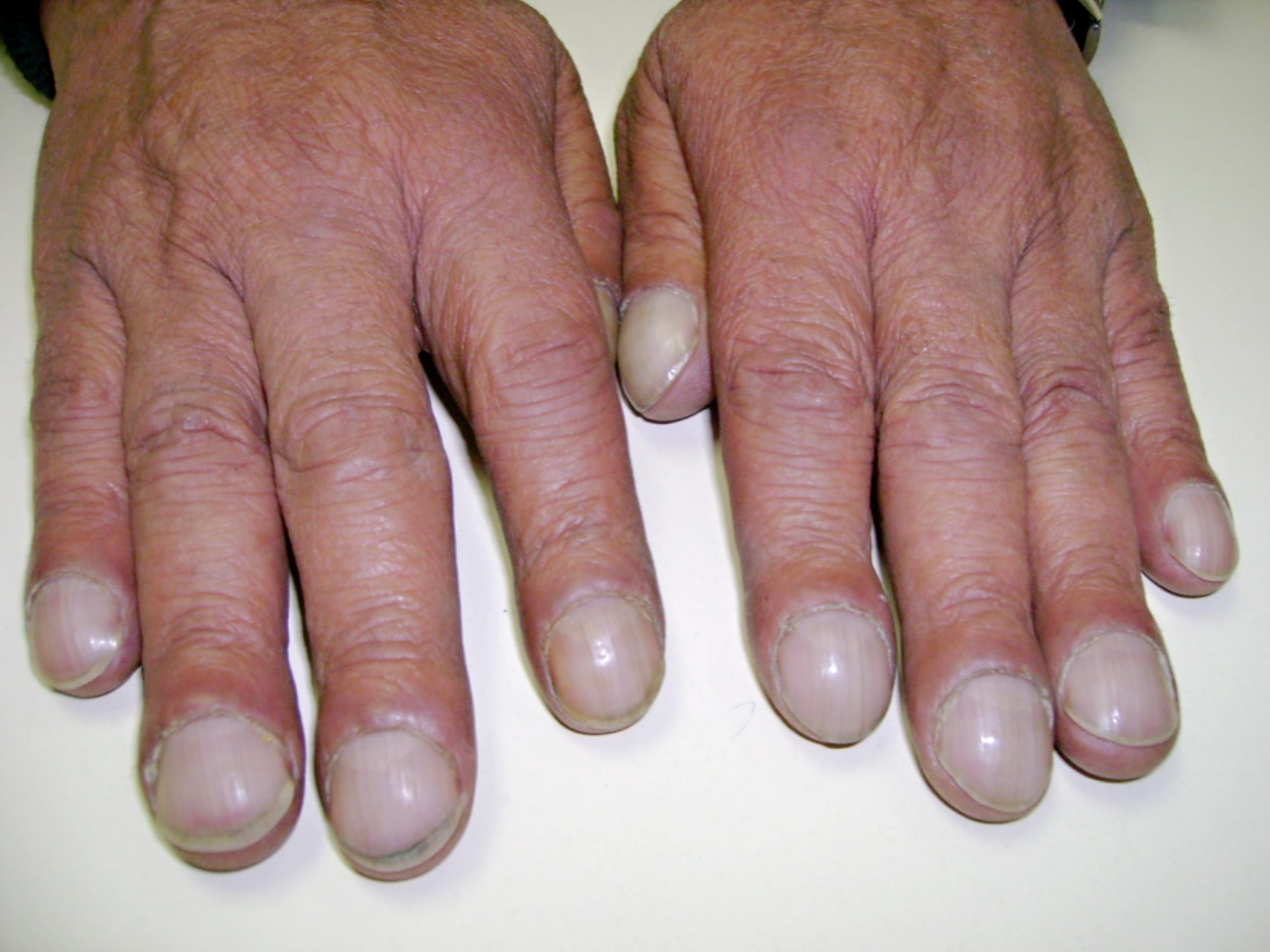
- Clubbing
- Specialty: Pulmonology

Nail clubbing, also known as digital clubbing or clubbing, is a deformity of the finger or toe nails associated with several diseases, anomalies and defects, some congenital, mostly of the heart and lungs. When it occurs together with joint effusions, joint pains, and abnormal skin and bone growth it is known as hypertrophic osteoarthropathy.

Clubbing is associated with lung cancer, lung infections, interstitial lung disease, cystic fibrosis, or cardiovascular disease. Clubbing may also run in families, and occur unassociated with other medical problems.

Clubbing has been recognized as a sign of disease since the time of Hippocrates. It is seen in 1% of internal medicine admissions and is associated with serious underlying disease in 40% of these admissions.

== Causes ==
Clubbing is associated with

- Lung disease:
  - Lung cancer
  - Interstitial lung disease most commonly idiopathic pulmonary fibrosis
  - Complicated tuberculosis
  - Suppurative lung disease: lung abscess, empyema, bronchiectasis, cystic fibrosis
  - Mesothelioma of the pleura
  - Sarcoidosis
- Heart disease:
  - Any disease featuring chronic hypoxia
  - Cyanotic heart defect (most common cardiac cause)
  - Infective endocarditis
  - Atrial myxoma (benign tumor)
  - Arteriovenous fistula or malformation
- Gastrointestinal and hepatobiliary:
  - Malabsorption
  - Crohn's disease and ulcerative colitis
  - Cirrhosis, especially in primary biliary cholangitis
  - Hepatopulmonary syndrome, a complication of cirrhosis
- Others:
  - Graves' disease (autoimmune hyperthyroidism) – in this case, it is known as thyroid acropachy
  - Familial and hereditary clubbing and "pseudoclubbing" (people of African descent often have what appears to be clubbing)
  - Vascular anomalies of the affected arm such as an axillary artery aneurysm (in unilateral clubbing)
  - Primary hypertrophic osteoarthropathy

Nail clubbing is not specific to chronic obstructive pulmonary disease (COPD). Therefore, in patients with COPD and significant degrees of clubbing, a search for signs of bronchogenic carcinoma (or other causes of clubbing) might still be indicated.

=== Hypertrophic pulmonary osteoarthropathy ===
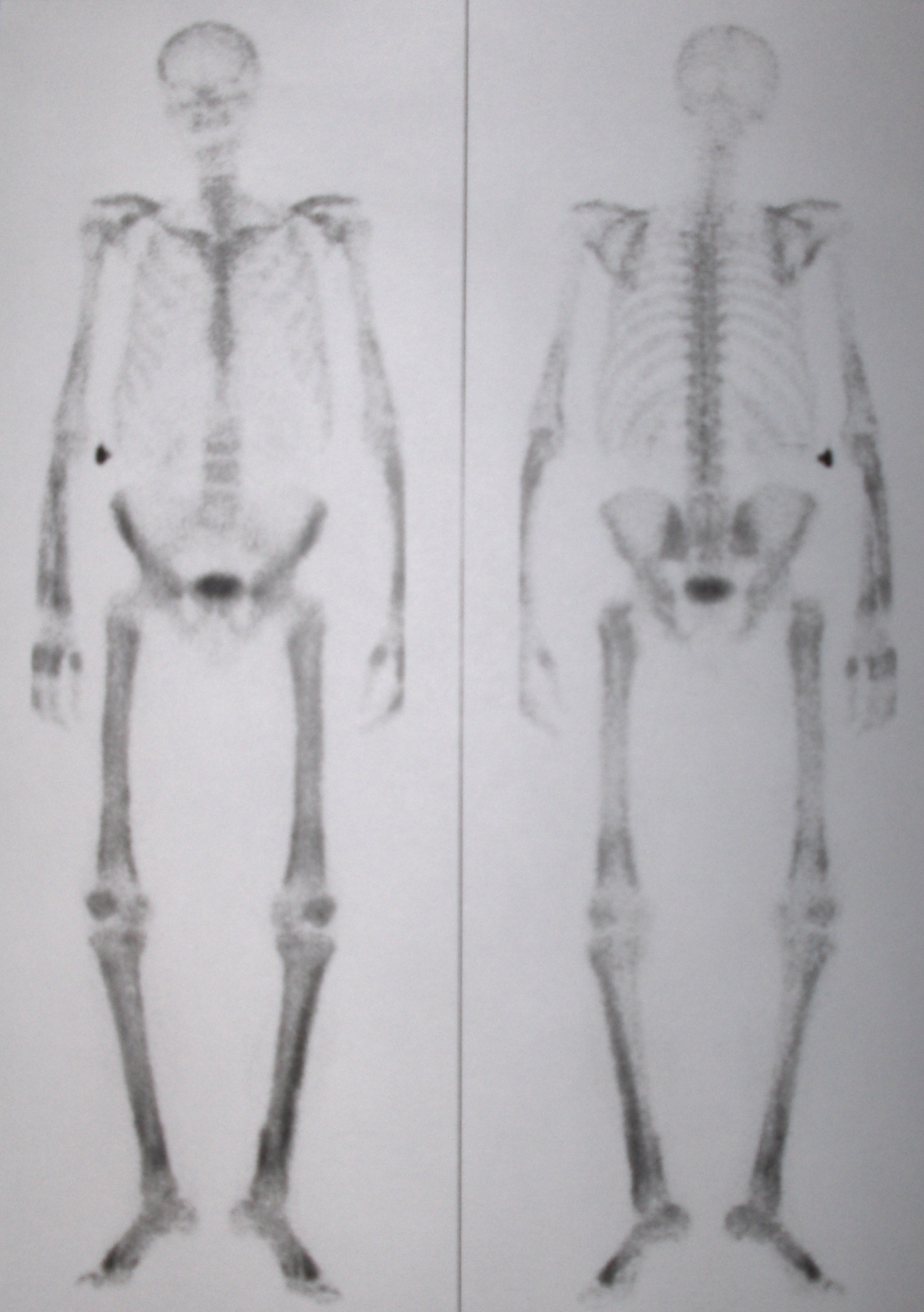
Bone scan of a patient with HPOA

A special form of clubbing is hypertrophic pulmonary osteoarthropathy (HPOA), known in continental Europe as Pierre Marie-Bamberger syndrome. This is the combination of clubbing and thickening of periosteum (connective tissue lining of the bones) and synovium (lining of joints), and is often initially diagnosed as arthritis. It is commonly associated with lung cancer.

=== Primary hypertrophic osteoarthropathy ===
Primary hypertrophic osteoarthropathy is HPOA without signs of pulmonary disease. This form has a hereditary component, although subtle cardiac abnormalities can occasionally be found. It is known eponymously as the Touraine–Solente–Golé syndrome. This condition has been linked to mutations in the gene on the fourth chromosome (4q33-q34) coding for the enzyme 15-hydroxyprostaglandin dehydrogenase (HPGD); this leads to decreased breakdown of prostaglandin E2 and elevated levels of this substance. Another congenital form involves mutations in SLCO2A1, which cells use to uptake prostaglandin from the surroundings.

== Pathogenesis ==
Most cases of nail clubbing appear linked to increased levels of platelet-derived growth factor (PDGF) and/or vascular endothelial growth factor (VEGF) signaling at the fingertips. Both have growth-promoting properties and cause vascular hyperplasia, capillary permeability (edema), and excessive fibroblast and osteoblast formation (hypertrophy of connective tissue including the bone). Specific causes include:

- Increased entry of megakaryocytes into the systemic circulation. Under normal circumstances in healthy individuals, megakaryocytes that arise from the bone marrow are trapped in the pulmonary capillary bed and broken down before entering the systemic circulation. In disorders where there is prominent extrapulmonary shunting of blood (e.g. cyanotic heart diseases, liver cirrhosis), the megakaryocytes can bypass the breakdown within the pulmonary circulation and enter the systemic circulation. They are then trapped within the capillary beds within the extremities, such as the digits, and release PDGF and VEGF.
- In cases or diffuse pulmonary diseases or lung cancer, the excess VEGF produced in the diseased parts of the lungs directly enter circulation.
- Hypoxia induces the expression of VEGF by platelets. It also enhances the release of PFGF and VEGF by megakaryocytes.
- Other causes of platelet and/or endothelial cell activation, including:
  - Overproduction of prostaglandin E by other tissues, such as in lung cancer and Crohn's disease. This is usually linked to higher levels of COX-2.
  - Underconsumption of prostaglandin E by other tissues, such as in HPGD and/or SLCO2A1 mutations (pachydermoperiostosis, see above).
  - Use of prostaglandin E medication.
  - A chronic excess of platelets, such as in inflammatory bowel disease.

In thyroid acropachy, the explanation leans autoimmune and probably involves a process similar to thyroid eye disease, with increased proliferation of fibroblasts and deposition of glycosamines. The cause is unclear in sarcoidosis, especially since clubbing is rare and happens in an advanced fibrotic stage.

The exact pathogenesis in hemiplegia is unknown aside from alterations in blood flow due to autonomic nervous system instability. The vagus nerve may play a role in cases linked to inflammatory bowel disease and/or lung cancer.

The exact cause of sporadic clubbing is unknown.

== Diagnosis ==
Clubbing of the fingernail: The red line shows the outline of a clubbed nail.

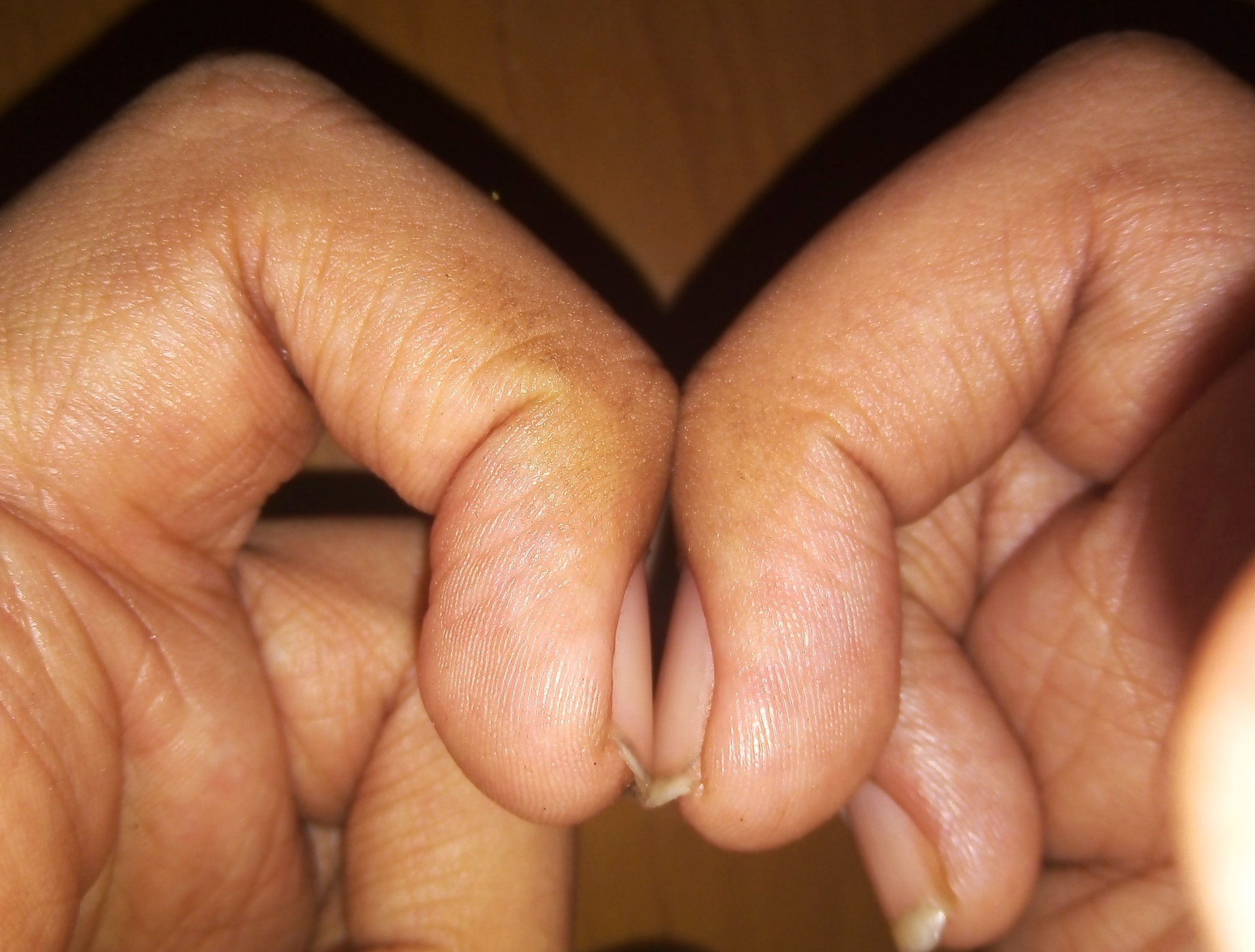
Schamroth's window test, done to identify nail clubbing

When clubbing is observed, pseudoclubbing should be excluded before making the diagnosis. Associated conditions may be identified by taking a detailed medical history—particular attention is paid to lung, heart, and gastrointestinal conditions—and conducting a thorough clinical examination, which may disclose associated features relevant to the underlying diagnosis. Additional studies, such as a chest X-ray and a chest CT-scan, may reveal otherwise asymptomatic cardiopulmonary disease.

=== Stages ===
Clubbing is present in one of five stages:

- No visible clubbing – Fluctuation (increased ballotability) and softening of the nail bed only. No visible changes in nails.
- Mild clubbing – Loss of the normal <165° angle (Lovibond angle) between the nailbed and the fold (cuticula). Schamroth's window (see image) is obliterated. Clubbing is not obvious at a glance.
- Moderate clubbing – Increased convexity of the nail fold. Clubbing is apparent at a glance.
- Gross clubbing – Thickening of the whole distal (end part of the) finger (resembling a drumstick)
- Hypertrophic osteoarthropathy – Shiny aspect and striation of the nail and skin

Schamroth's sign or Schamroth's window test (originally demonstrated by South African cardiologist Leo Schamroth on himself) is a popular test for clubbing. When the distal phalanges (bones nearest the fingertips) of corresponding fingers of opposite hands are directly opposed (place fingernails of the same finger on opposite hands against each other, nail to nail), a small diamond-shaped "window" is normally apparent between the nailbeds. If this window is obliterated, the test is positive, and clubbing is present.

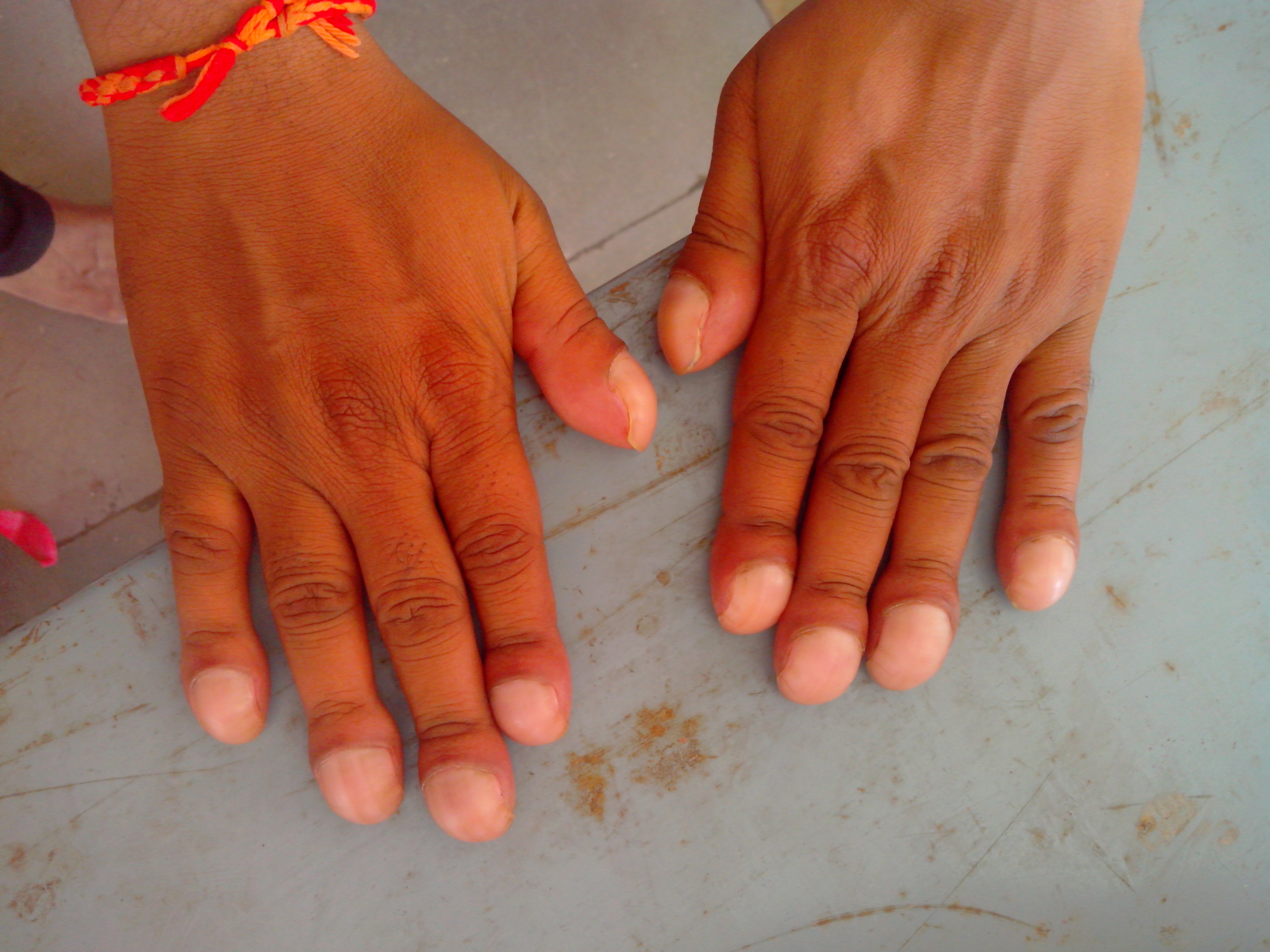
Severe clubbing

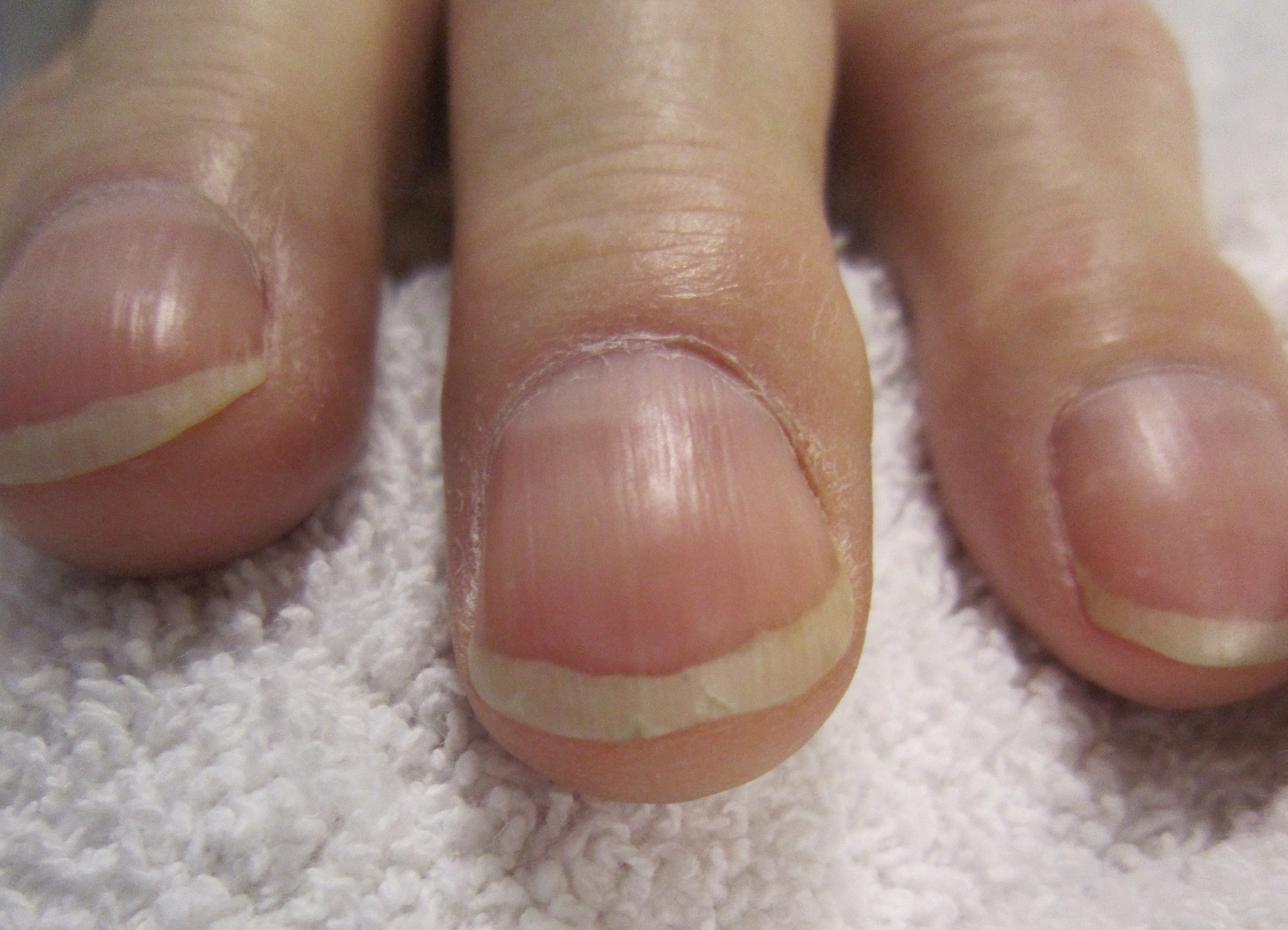
Front view

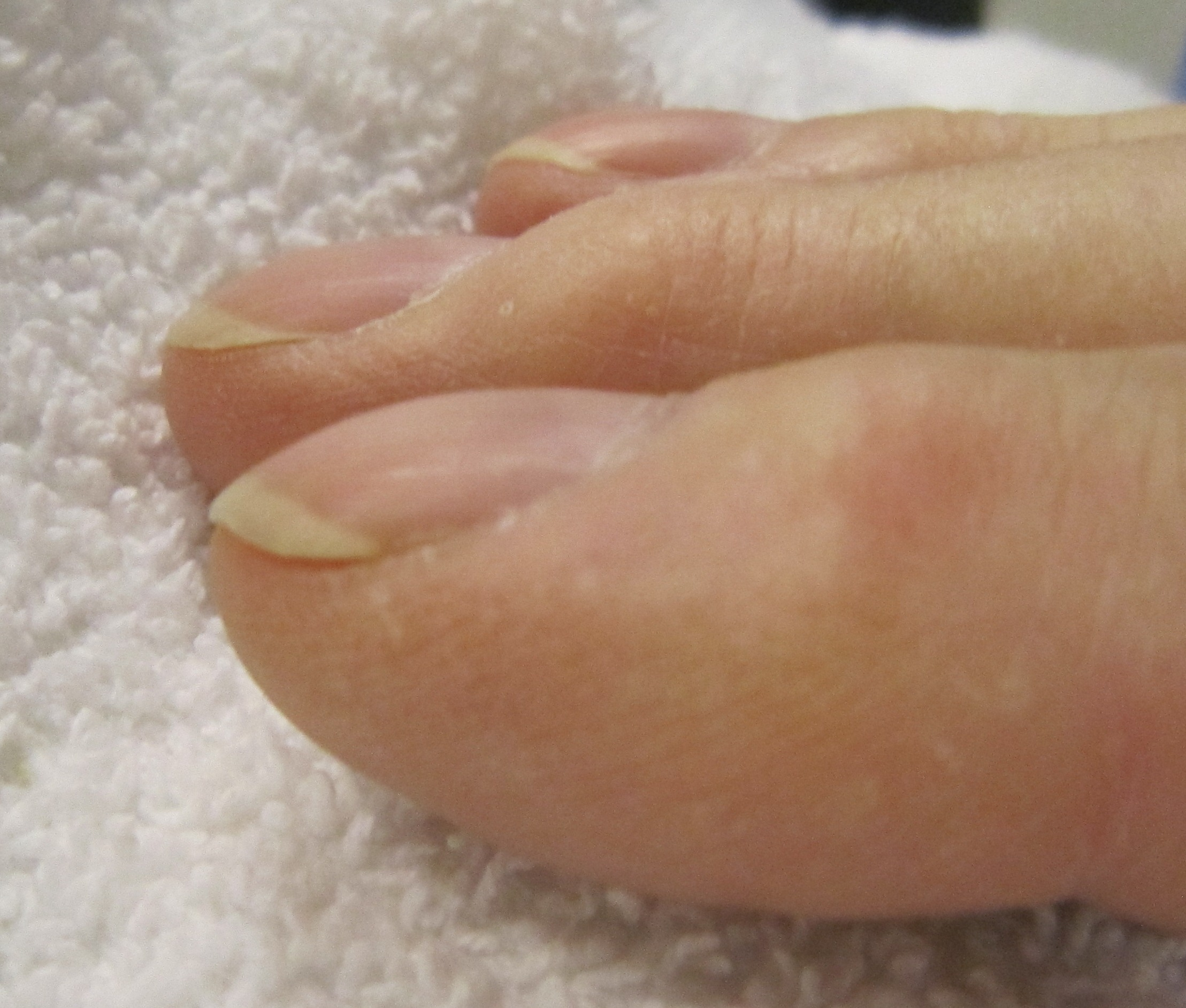
Side views

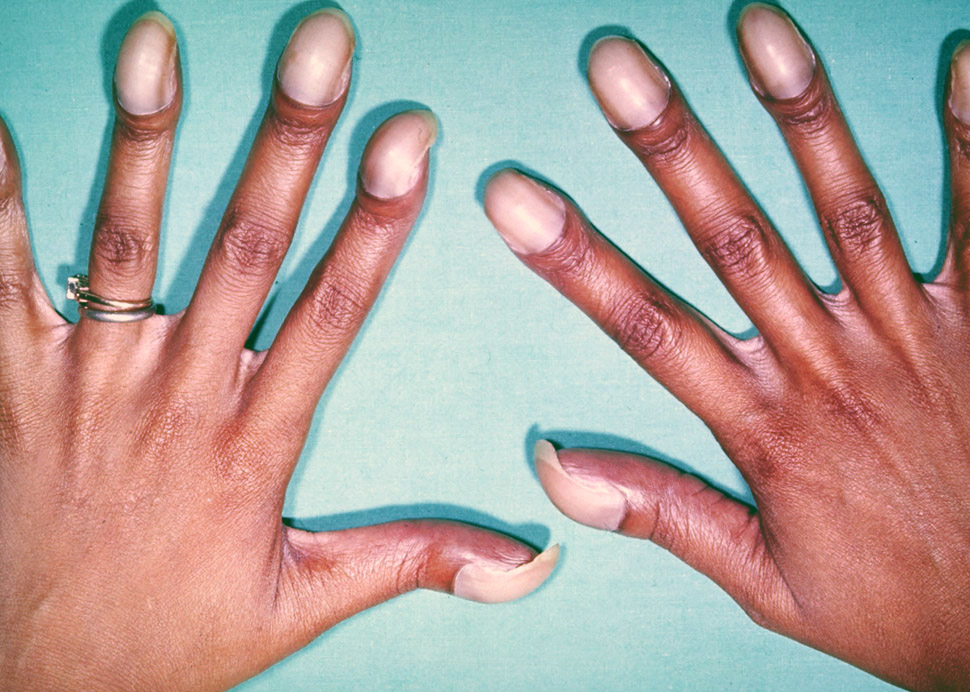
Cyanotic nail beds

== Epidemiology ==
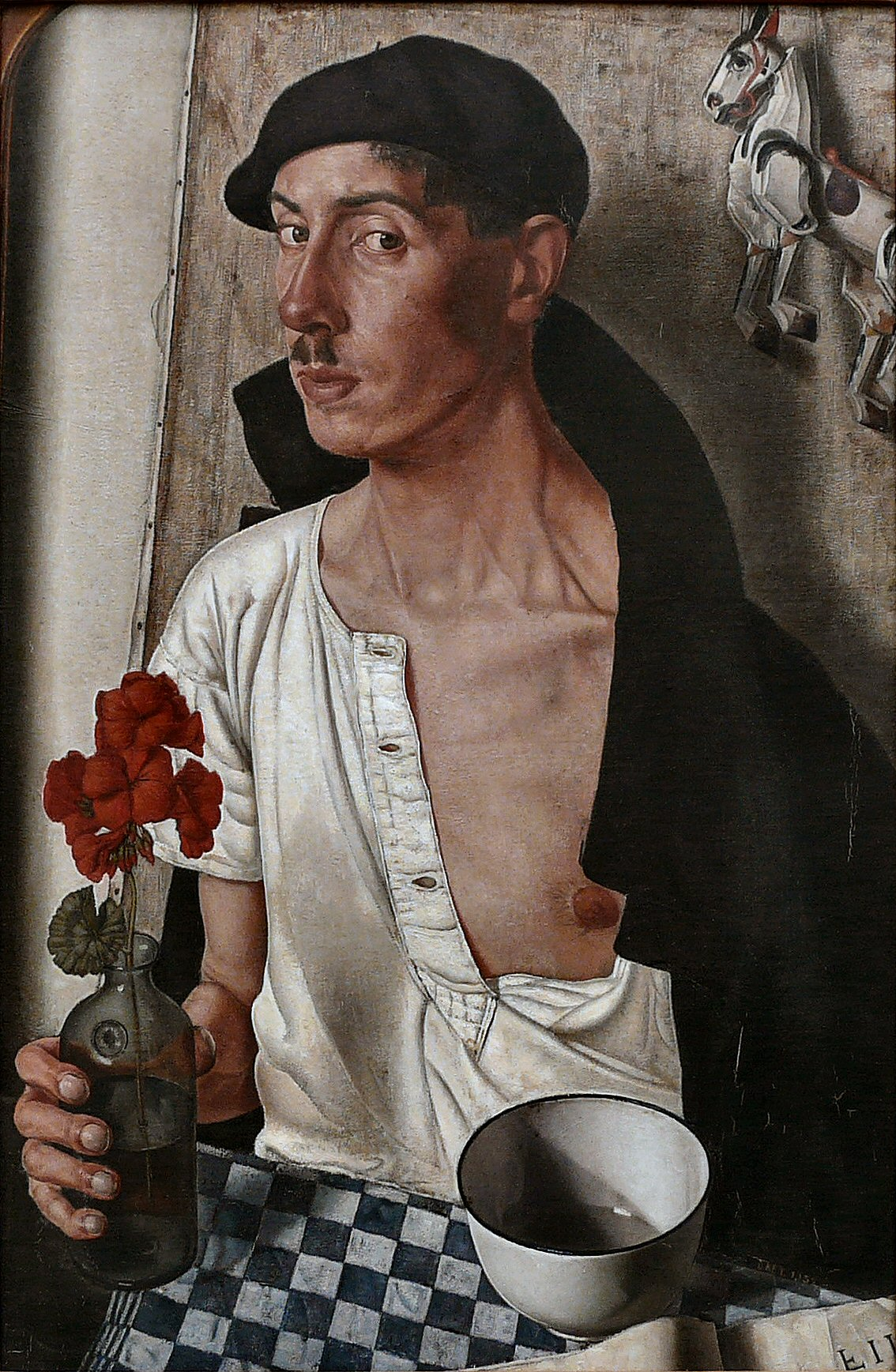
Self-portrait by Dick Ket showing nail clubbing.

The exact frequency of clubbing in the population is not known. A 2008 study found clubbing in 1%, or 15 patients, of 1511 patients admitted to a department of internal medicine in Belgium. Of these, 40%, or 6 patients, had significant underlying disease of various causes, while 60%, or nine patients, had no medical problems after further investigation and remained well over the subsequent year.

== History ==
At least since the time of Hippocrates, clubbing has been recognized as a sign of disease. The phenomenon has been called "Hippocratic fingers".

The Dutch painter Dick Ket had nail clubbing, as is seen from his paintings. He had an underlying disease, probably dextrocardia.

== See also ==
- Clubbed thumb (unrelated congenital deformity)
