= Pachyderma =

Thickening of the skin

- Specialty: Dermatology

Pachyderma, or pachydermia, is the thickening of skin like that of a pachyderm (a tough-skinned animal such as an elephant, rhinoceros, tapir or hippopotamus). It occurs in the condition pachydermoperiostosis, an autosomal genetic disorder. It can also occur in acromegaly, elephantiasis, and podoconiosis. The adjective pachydermatous is used to describe skin showing symptoms of this condition.
