= Chlortalidone =

Thiazide-like diuretic drug

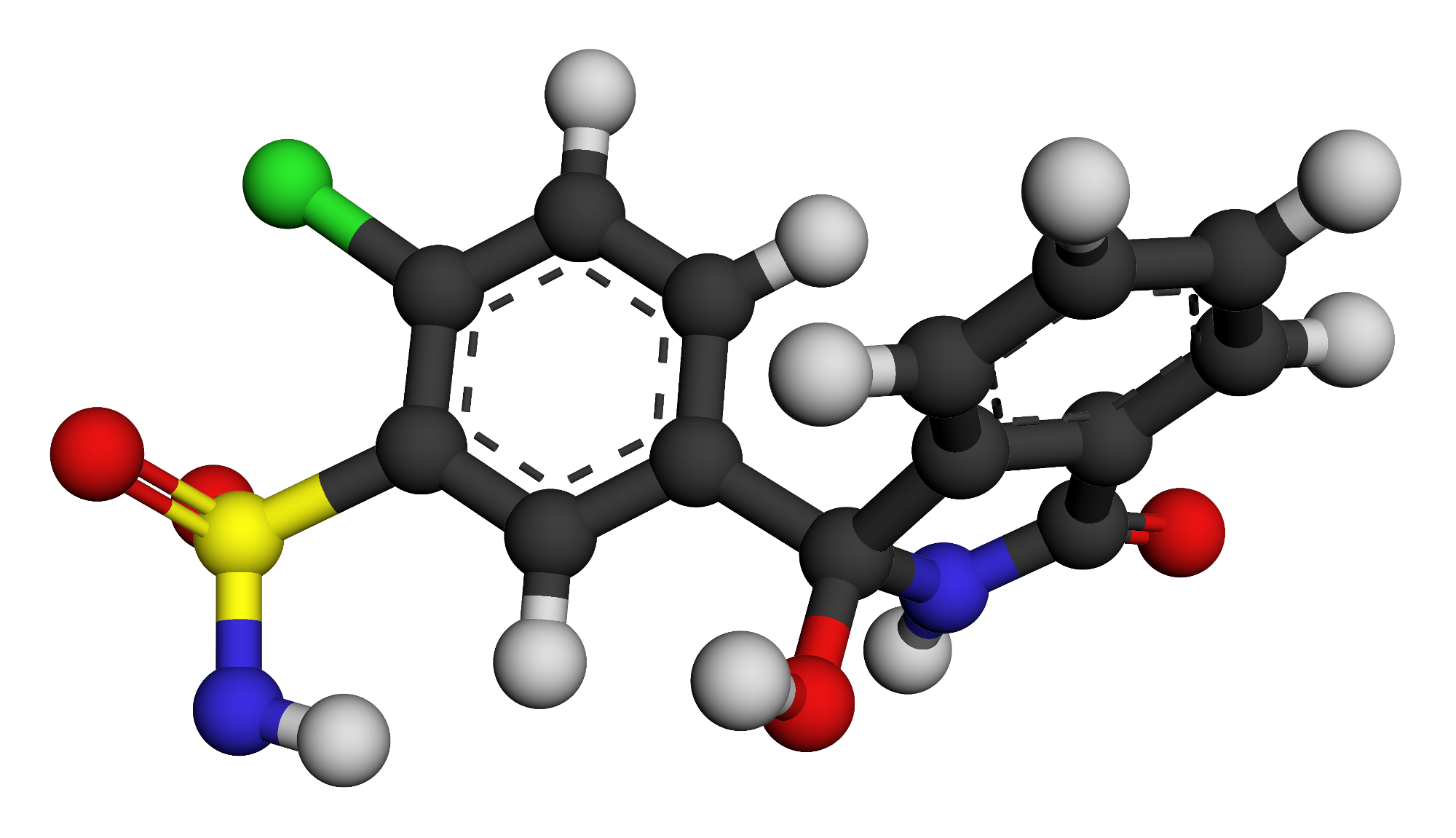

Clinical data
- Trade names: Hygroton, Thalitone, others
- AHFS/Drugs.com: Monograph
- MedlinePlus: a682342
- License data: US DailyMed: Chlorthalidone
- Pregnancy category: AU: C
- Routes of administration: By mouth
- Drug class: Thiazide-like diuretic
- ATC code: C03BA04 (WHO)

Legal status
- Legal status: UK: POM (Prescription only); US: ℞-only

Pharmacokinetic data
- Protein binding: 75%
- Elimination half-life: 40 hours
- Excretion: Kidney

Identifiers
- IUPAC name: (RS)-2-Chloro-5-(1-hydroxy-3-oxo-2,3-dihydro-1H-isoindol-1-yl)benzene-1-sulfonamide
- CAS Number: 77-36-1
- PubChem CID: 2732
- IUPHAR/BPS: 7147
- DrugBank: DB00310
- ChemSpider: 2631
- UNII: Q0MQD1073Q
- KEGG: D00272
- ChEBI: CHEBI:3654
- ChEMBL: ChEMBL1055
- CompTox Dashboard (EPA): DTXSID4022812
- ECHA InfoCard: 100.000.930

Chemical and physical data
- Formula: C_{14}H_{11}ClN_{2}O_{4}S
- Molar mass: 338.76 g·mol^{−1}
- 3D model (JSmol): Interactive image
- Chirality: Racemic mixture
- SMILES: O=S(=O)(N)c1c(Cl)ccc(c1)C2(O)c3ccccc3C(=O)N2
- InChI: InChI=1S/C14H11ClN2O4S/c15-11-6-5-8(7-12(11)22(16,20)21)14(19)10-4-2-1-3-9(10)13(18)17-14/h1-7,19H,(H,17,18)(H2,16,20,21); Key:JIVPVXMEBJLZRO-UHFFFAOYSA-N

Chlortalidone, also known as chlorthalidone, is a thiazide-like diuretic drug used to treat high blood pressure, swelling (such as occurs in heart failure, liver failure, and nephrotic syndrome), diabetes insipidus, and renal tubular acidosis. Because chlortalidone is effective in most patients with high blood pressure, it is considered a preferred initial treatment. It is also used to prevent calcium-based kidney stones. It is taken by mouth. Effects generally begin within three hours and last for up to three days. Long-term treatment with chlortalidone is more effective than hydrochlorothiazide for prevention of heart attack or stroke.

== Adverse effects and mechanism ==
Common adverse effects include low blood potassium, low blood sodium, high blood sugar, dizziness, and erectile dysfunction. Other adverse effects may include gout, low blood magnesium, high blood calcium, allergic reactions, and low blood pressure. Some reviews have found chlortalidone and hydrochlorothiazide to have a similar risk of adverse effects, while other reviews have found chlortalidone to have a higher risk. (Note: However, chlorthalidone use is more frequently associated with adverse metabolic effects, particularly hypokalemia and hyponatremia, compared with HCTZ.) While it may be used in pregnancy it is a less preferred option. The mechanism of action is not fully understood, but it is known that chlorthalidone causes increased excretion of sodium, chloride, and water, primarily by acting on the cortical diluting segment (Note: consisting of the thick ascending limb of the loop of Henle and the early portion of the distal convoluted tubule) of the nephron.

Chlortalidone was patented in 1957 and came into medical use in 1960. It is on the World Health Organization's List of Essential Medicines. It is available as a generic medication. In 2023, it was the 124th most commonly prescribed medication in the United States, with more than 5 million prescriptions.

== Medical use ==
=== High blood pressure ===
Chlortalidone is considered a first-line medication for treatment of high blood pressure. Some recommend chlortalidone over hydrochlorothiazide. A meta-analysis of randomized controlled trials found that chlortalidone is more effective than hydrochlorothiazide for lowering blood pressure, while the two drugs have similar toxicity.

Trials of chlortalidone for high blood pressure found that lower doses of chlortalidone (e.g., 12.5 mg daily in ALLHAT study) had maximal blood pressure lowering effect and that higher doses did not lower it more. Chlortalidone and other thiazide diuretics are effective for lowering high blood pressure in persons with chronic kidney disease, although the risk of adverse effects is higher.

=== Left ventricular hypertrophy ===
Chlortalidone is used to treat enlargement of the left ventricle of the heart; it works chiefly by lowering blood pressure, and thereby reducing systemic vascular resistance. There is evidence that chlortalidone is superior to hydrochlorothiazide for reducing the mass of the left ventricle of the heart in persons with enlargement of the left ventricle of the heart. Chlortalidone is superior to angiotensin converting enzyme Inhibitors or angiotensin II receptor blockers for inducing regression of enlargement of the left ventricle, which is the main pumping chamber of the heart.

=== Swelling ===
Chlortalidone reduces edema (swelling) by increasing urinary salt and water excretion, lowering intravascular hydrostatic pressure and thereby lowering transcapillary pressure (see Starling Equation). Edema may be caused by either increased hydrostatic pressure or reduced oncotic pressure in the blood vessels. Edema due to increased hydrostatic pressure may be a result of serious cardiopulmonary disease (which reduces glomerular perfusion in the kidney) or to kidney injury or disease (which may reduce glomerular excretion of salt and water by the kidney) or due to relatively benign conditions such as menstrual-related fluid retention, or as an adverse effect of dihydropyridine calcium channel blockers, which commonly cause swelling of the feet and lower legs. Edema due to decreased oncotic pressure may be a result of leaking of blood proteins through the glomeruli of an injured kidney or a result of diminished synthesis of blood proteins by a damaged liver. Regardless of cause, chlortalidone may reduce the severity of edema by reducing intravascular volume and thereby reducing intravascular hydrostatic pressure.

=== Bone fracture prevention ===
Chlortalidone decreases mineral bone loss by promoting calcium retention by the kidney, and by directly stimulating osteoblast differentiation and bone mineral formation. A Cochrane review found tentative evidence that thiazide exposure was associated with a reduced risk of hip fracture. A secondary analysis of data from the ALLHAT study found that chlortalidone reduced risk of hip and pelvis fracture.

=== Kidney stone prevention ===
Chlortalidone reduces the amount of calcium excreted in urine, reducing the risk of calcium oxalate kidney stones. In people who have had multiple episodes of calcium oxalate kidney stones, chlortalidone lowers the risk of having another episode of kidney stones. Chlortalidone is more effective than hydrochlorothiazide for lowering urine calcium levels and is therefore probably more effective.

=== Ménière's disease ===
Chlortalidone reduces the endolymph volume which reduces the hydrostatic pressure in the inner ear chambers; elevated endolymph pressure in the inner ear is thought to be the cause of Ménière's disease or 'Endolymphatic hydrops.' Synthesis of evidence from multiple small, low-quality studies indicates that chlortalidone or other thiazide diuretics are effective for Ménière's Disease.

=== Diabetes insipidus ===
Chlortalidone (or other thiazide medication) is a key component of treatment of nephrogenic diabetes insipidus. Nephrogenic diabetes insipidus occurs when the kidney is unable to concentrate urine because it has an inadequate response to vasopressin-dependent removal of free water from the renal tubular filtrate. By blocking sodium ion resorption in the distal convoluted tubule, chlortalidone induces an increase in excretion of sodium ion in urine (natriuresis). Giving chlortalidone while simultaneously restricting dietary sodium intake causes mild hypovolemia (low intravascular volume), which induces isotonic reabsorption of solute from the proximal renal tubule, reducing solute delivery in the renal collecting tubule and renal medullary collecting duct. This reduced delivery of solute to the collecting tubule and medullary collecting duct allows increased water resorption and higher concentration of urine, which leads to reversal of nephrogenic diabetes insipidus by a means that is independent of vasopressin.

== Adverse effects ==
Some reviews have found a similar risk as hydrochlorothiazide, while other reviews found a higher risk of side effects.

- Hypokalemia (low blood potassium) occurs occasionally; the risk of hypokalemia is higher in persons who are magnesium deficient
- Hypomagnesemia (low blood magnesium) a review of four clinical trials found that low blood magnesium occurred in 20% of persons within a few weeks of beginning treatment with 50 mg of chlortalidone daily. The risk of chlortalidone-associated hypomagnesemia is higher in persons with diabetes mellitus who have low dietary magnesium intake.
- Hyponatremia (low blood sodium) occurred in 4.1% of subjects randomized to chlortalidone in the Systolic Hypertension in the Elderly Trial, compared to 1.3% of control subjects. The risk of hyponatremia varies from 5 per 100,000 person-years for those younger than 40 years of age to 730 per 100,000 person-years in those older than 80 years of age. Hyponatremia is more likely in persons with certain genetic variants of the prostaglandin transporter SLCO2A1 associated with elevated urinary PGE_{2} and inappropriately low plasma ADH levels in the setting of low plasma osmolality. Thiazide-associated hyponatremia is often more severe than loop diuretic-associated hyponatremia because the predominant action of thiazides occurs late in the tubular flow, reducing opportunity to apply additional corrective action further along the tubule.
- Hypercalcemia (high blood calcium level) can occur in normal persons exposed to chlortalidone but is more likely to occur when persons with sub-clinical hyperparathyroidism are exposed to chlortalidone.
- Hyperuricemia, high levels of uric acid in the blood
- Hyperlipidemia, high cholesterol and triglycerides
- Headache
- Nausea/vomiting
- Photosensitivity increased susceptibility to sunburn of skin with sun exposure
- Photoonycholysis detachment of nails from nailbed with sun exposure
- Weight gain
- Gout; approximately doubles the risk
- Pancreatitis

== Mechanism of action ==
Chlortalidone reduces reabsorption of sodium and chloride primarily through inhibition of the Na^{+}/Cl^{−} symporter in the apical membrane of distal convoluted tubule cells in the kidney. Although chlortalidone is often referred to as a "thiazide-like" diuretic, it is unlike thiazide diuretics in that, in addition to its inhibition of the Na^{+}/Cl^{−} symporter, it also strongly inhibits multiple isoforms of carbonic anhydrase. Some of chlortalidone's diuretic effect is also due to this inhibition of carbonic anhydrase in the proximal tubule.

There is uncertainty about the mechanism of the blood pressure-lowering effect that occurs during chronic exposure to chlortalidone.

== Pharmacokinetics ==
Chlortalidone is slowly absorbed from the gastrointestinal tract after oral ingestion. It has a long half-life and therefore a prolonged diuretic action, which results in continued diuretic effects despite a skipped dose. This prolonged action of chlortalidone despite missing doses may account for the higher efficacy of chlortalidone compared to the shorter half-life medication, hydrochlorothiazide. Chlortalidone is eliminated from the body mostly by the kidney, as unchanged drug. Thus, in persons with diminished kidney function, the clearance of chlortalidone is reduced and the elimination half-life is increased.

As with other thiazide diuretics, chlortalidone crosses the placenta and is excreted in breast milk. Chlortalidone may suppress lactation, and has been used for this indication. Due to its long half-life, chlortalidone may accumulate in newborns via breast milk, despite receiving only about 6% of the maternal weight-adjusted dose.

== Chemistry ==
Chlortalidone is in the sulfamoylbenzamide class. As it lacks the benzothiadiazine structure of the thiazide-type diuretics, it is called a thiazide-like diuretic. Chlortalidone is freely soluble in dimethylacetamide (DMA), dimethylformamide (DMF), dimethylsulfoxide (DMSO), and methanol; it is also soluble in warm ethanol.

Chlortalidone is the official name of the medication according to the (INN/BAN), which is the medication naming system coordinated by the World Health Organization. Chlorthalidone is the official name of the medication according to the (USAN), which is the medication naming system coordinated by the USAN Council, which is co-sponsored by the American Medical Association (AMA), the United States Pharmacopeial Convention (USP), and the American Pharmacists Association (APhA).

== Batch Recall ==
The US Food and Drug Administration (FDA) issued a nationwide recall for over 11,000 bottles of Chlorthalidone (25 mg) blood pressure medication due to failed dissolution specifications. The recall affected 100-count and 1,000-count bottles distributed by Rising Pharma Holdings, Inc., all bearing an expiration date of 04/2027.

== Society and culture ==
Chlortalidone is banned for some sports (including cricket) because it is a diuretic, and can be used to reduce body weight or to mask the concomitant use of performance-enhancing drugs. Sports such as wrestling or boxing categorize athletes according to body weight; taking a diuretic such as chlortalidone may lower body weight, and thereby permit an athlete to compete in a lighter weight class, which would provide an advantage. Diuretics such as chlortalidone also reduce the urine concentration of concomitantly-taken performance-enhancing drugs or of their metabolites, thus making it more difficult to detect these drugs using urine testing.
