= Periosteal reaction =

Formation of new bone in response to stimuli of the periosteum surrounding the bone

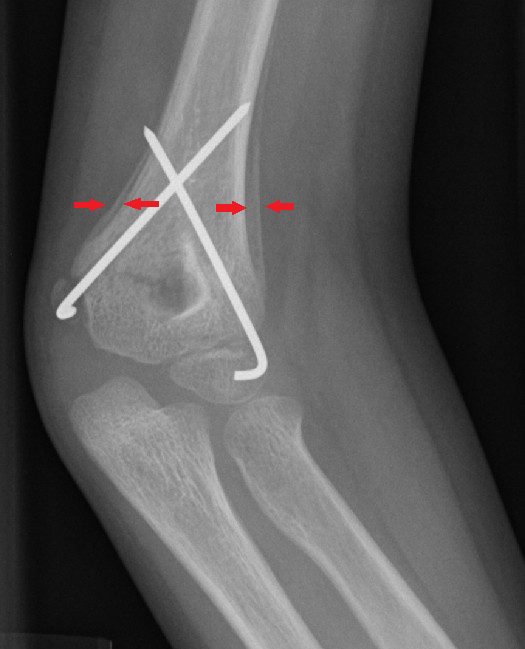
- Periosteal reaction on a healing supracondylar fracture
- Specialty: Orthopedics

A periosteal reaction is the formation of new bone in response to injury or other stimuli of the periosteum surrounding the bone. It is most often identified on X-ray films of the bones.

== Cause ==
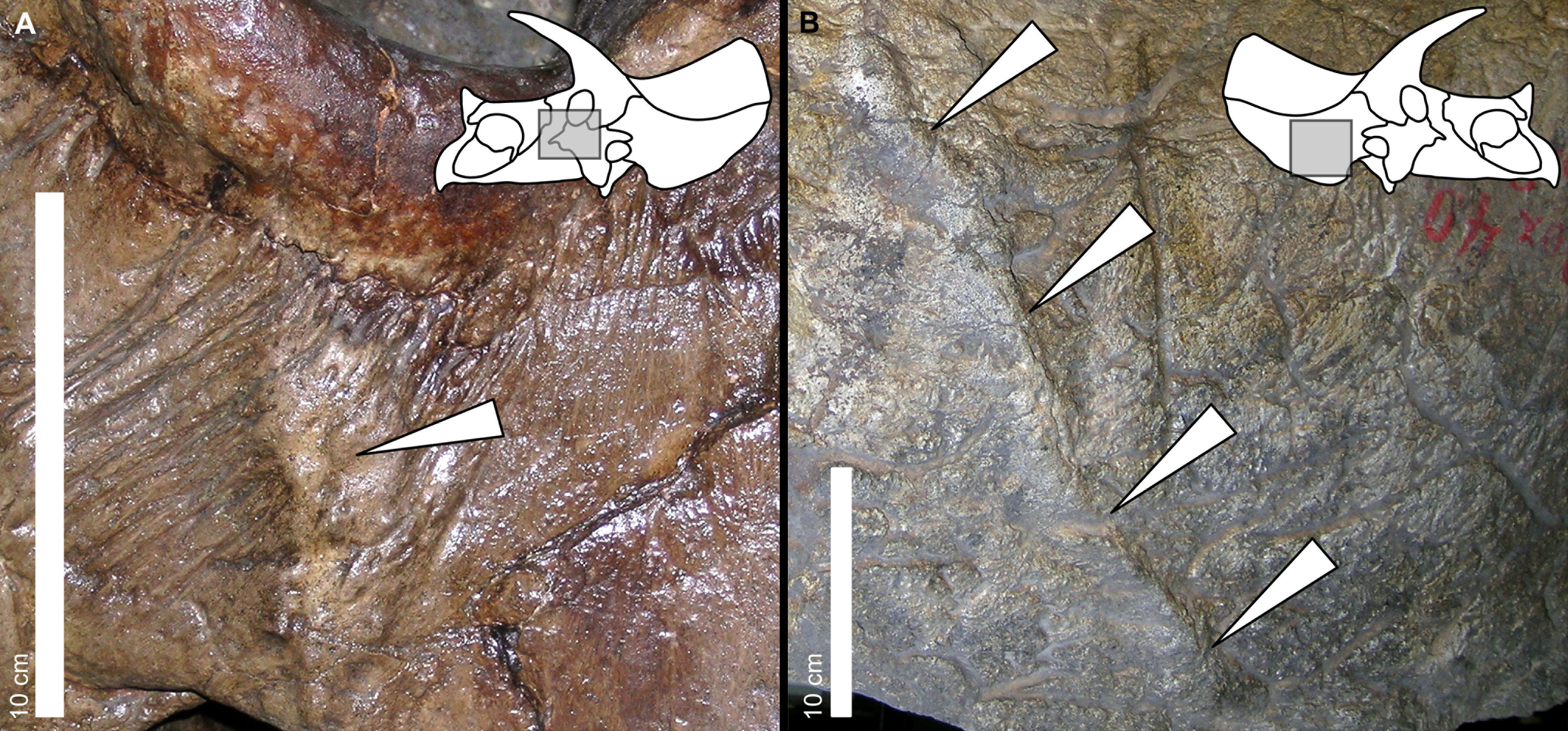
Examples of periosteal reactive bone in selected specimens of Triceratops

A periosteal reaction can result from a large number of causes, including injury and chronic irritation due to a medical condition such as hypertrophic osteopathy, bone healing in response to fracture, chronic stress injuries, subperiosteal hematomas, osteomyelitis, and cancer of the bone. It may also occur as part of thyroid acropachy, a severe sign of the autoimmune thyroid disorder Graves' disease.

Other causes include Menkes disease and hypervitaminosis A.

It can take about three weeks to appear.

== Diagnosis ==
The morphological appearance can be helpful in determining the cause of a periosteal reaction (for example, if other features of periostitis are present), but is usually not enough to be definitive. Diagnosis can be helped by establishing if bone formation is localized to a specific point or generalized to a broad area. The appearance of the adjacent bone will give clues as to which of these is the most likely cause.

Appearances include solid, laminated, spiculated, and the Codman triangle.

== See also ==
- Hypertrophic pulmonary osteoarthropathy
