= Chronic enteropathy associated with SLCO2A1 gene =

- Chronic enteropathy associated with SLCO2A1 gene is inherited in an autosomal recessive manner

Chronic enteropathy associated with SLCO2A1 gene is a rare autosomal recessive enteropathy that was first described in 1968. This condition was previously named chronic nonspecific multiple ulcers of the small intestine.

== Presentation ==
This disease occurs most commonly in women. Symptom onset is usually in adolescence. Symptoms include fatigue, oedema and abdominal pain. The disease course is chronic and while immunosuppressants have been tried these have not been shown to be helpful. On small bowel endoscopy the ulcers may be visible.

== Genetics ==
Sequencing the DNA of several patients suggested a mutation in the SLCO2A1 gene. The presence of this mutation was confirmed by sequencing this gene in additional patients.

This gene encodes a prostaglandin transporter. As non-steroidal anti-inflammatory drugs inhibit prostaglandin synthesis this helps to explain the known similarity in the histological findings between these conditions. The identification of this mutation suggests that prostaglandin replacement may be helpful but this will need to be tested in a clinical trial.

== Pathology ==
Within the small intestine there are multiple small shallow ulcers which may be linear or concentric. Stenosis of the small bowel may be present due to healing of these ulcers. The ulcers resemble those associated with non steroidal use but occur in the absence of the use of these drugs.

== Diagnosis ==
Immunohistochemical staining for SLCO2A1 in gastro-duodenal tissue biopsy, may be helpful in distinguishing chronic enteropathy from Crohn's disease.
