= HPGD =

Protein-coding gene in humans

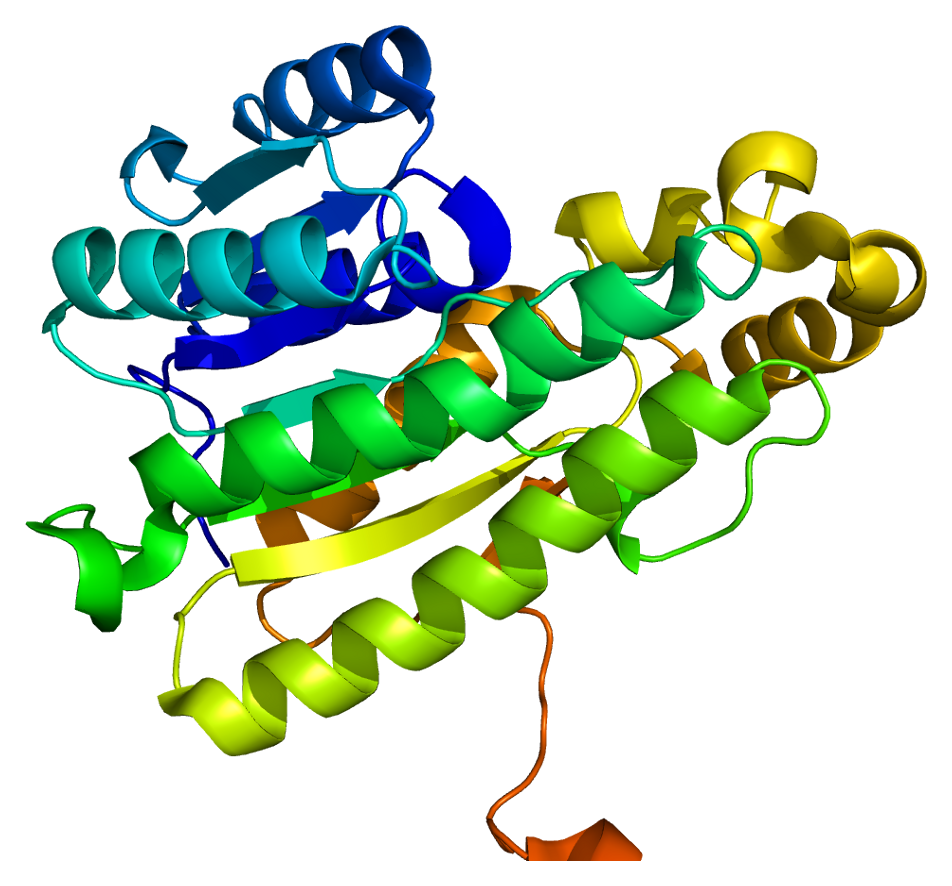

Identifiers
- Aliases: HPGD, 15-PGDH, PGDH, PGDH1, PHOAR1, SDR36C1, hydroxyprostaglandin dehydrogenase 15-(NAD), 15-hydroxyprostaglandin dehydrogenase
- External IDs: OMIM: 601688; MGI: 108085; GeneCards: HPGD
Available structures
PDB	Ortholog search: PDBe RCSB
PDB	List of PDB id codes 2GDZ
Enzyme activity
EC #	BRENDA	ExPASy	KEGG	MetaCyc
1.1.1.141	↗	↗	↗	↗
1.1.1.232	↗	↗	↗	↗

Gene location (Human)
Chr.	Chromosome 4 (human)
Band	4q34.1	Start	174,490,175 bp
Band	4q34.1	End	174,523,154 bp

Gene location (Mouse)
Chr.	Chromosome 8 (mouse)
Band	8|8 B2	Start	56,747,620 bp
Band	8|8 B2	End	56,774,078 bp
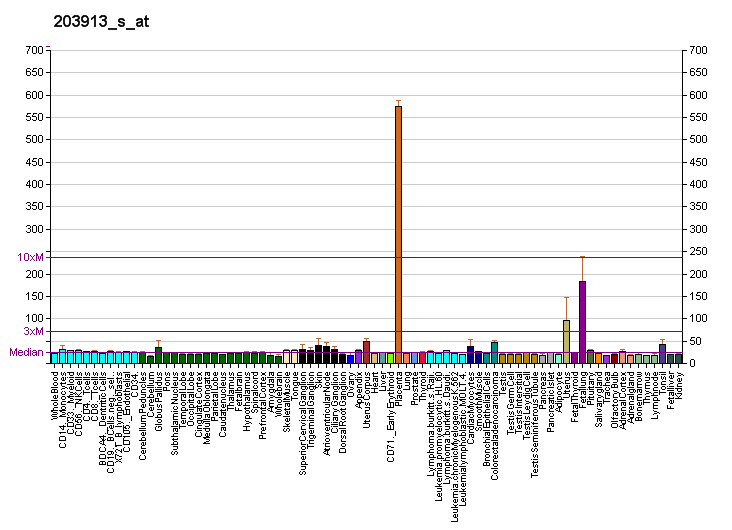

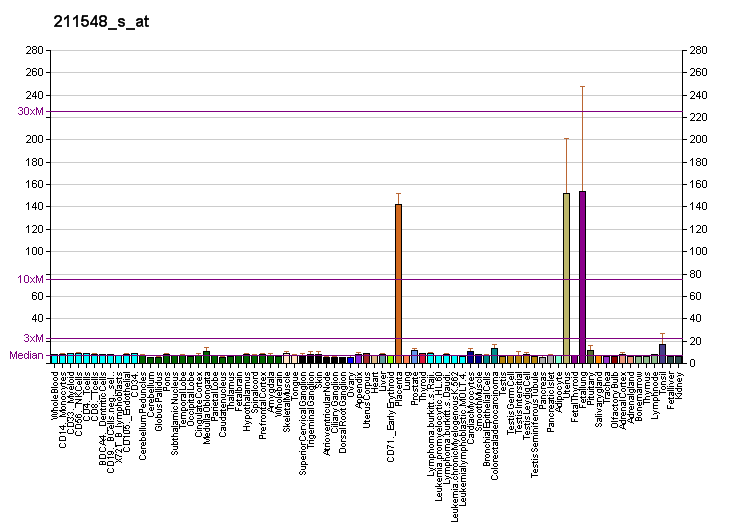

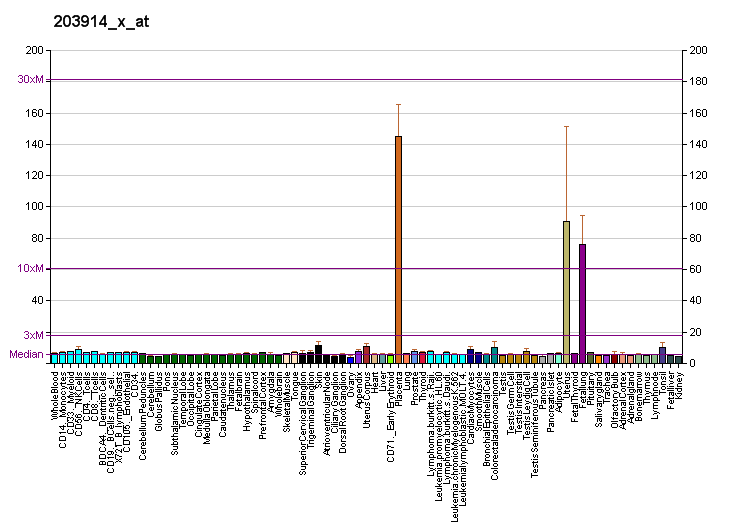
RNA expression pattern
Bgee	Human / Mouse (ortholog); Top expressed in: jejunal mucosa; rectum; mucosa of colon; placenta; metanephric glomerulus; right lung; lower lobe of lung; mucosa of sigmoid colon; mucosa of transverse colon; mucosa of ileum / Top expressed in: right lung lobe; seminal vesicula; wall of urinary bladder; mucosa of urinary bladder; transitional epithelium of urinary bladder; pyloric antrum; epithelium of stomach; left colon; body of femur; duodenum; More reference expression data
BioGPS	More reference expression data
Gene ontology
Molecular function	NAD binding; 15-hydroxyprostaglandin dehydrogenase (NAD+) activity; catalytic activity; prostaglandin E receptor activity; NAD+ binding; oxidoreductase activity; protein homodimerization activity
Cellular component	nucleoplasm; basolateral plasma membrane; extracellular exosome; cytoplasm; cytosol; extracellular space
Biological process	prostaglandin metabolic process; thrombin-activated receptor signaling pathway; lipid metabolism; negative regulation of cell cycle; fatty acid metabolic process; lipoxygenase pathway; birth; lipoxin metabolic process; transforming growth factor beta receptor signaling pathway; ovulation; ductus arteriosus closure; response to lipopolysaccharide; kidney development; female pregnancy; response to estradiol; positive regulation of apoptotic process; response to ethanol; positive regulation of vascular associated smooth muscle cell proliferation; long-chain fatty acid biosynthetic process; lipoxin biosynthetic process
Sources:Amigo / QuickGO
Orthologs
Databases	NCBI: entry; OMA: entry
Species	Human	Mouse
Entrez	3248	15446
Ensembl	ENSG00000164120	ENSMUSG00000031613
UniProt	P15428	Q8VCC1
RefSeq (mRNA)	NM_000860; NM_001145816; NM_001256301; NM_001256305; NM_001256306 NM_001256307; NM_001363574	NM_008278
RefSeq (protein)	NP_000851; NP_001139288; NP_001243230; NP_001243234; NP_001243235 NP_001243236; NP_001350503	NP_032304
Location (UCSC)	Chr 4: 174.49 – 174.52 Mb	Chr 8: 56.75 – 56.77 Mb
PubMed search
- Wikidata
View/Edit Human	View/Edit Mouse

Hydroxyprostaglandin dehydrogenase 15-(NAD) (the HUGO-approved official symbol = HPGD; HGNC ID, HGNC:5154), also called 15-hydroxyprostaglandin dehydrogenase [NAD+], is an enzyme that in humans is encoded by the HPGD gene.

In melanocytic cells HPGD gene expression may be regulated by MITF.

== Tissue distribution ==
HPGD RNA-seq was performed in tissue samples from 95 human individuals representing 27 different tissues to determine tissue-specificity of all protein-coding genes. HPGD was expressed in the adrenal, appendix, bone marrow, brain, colon, duodenum, endometrium, esophagus, fat, gall bladder, heart, kidney, liver, lung, lymph node, ovary, pancreas, placenta, prostate, salivary gland, skin, small intestine, spleen, stomach, testis, thyroid, urinary bladder

== Function ==
15-hydroxy prostaglandin dehydrogenase (HPGD, also referred to as 15-PGDH) is an enzyme belongs to the family of oxidoreductases, specifically the short chain dehydrogenase/reductase family 36C member 1. This protein coding gene encodes a member of the short chain alcohol dehydrogenase protein family. HPGD catalyzes the first step in the catabolic pathway of prostaglandins and is therefore responsible for the metabolic/catabolic inactivation of prostaglandins. This inactivation process will oxidize the 15-hydroxyl group of prostaglandins and yield the corresponding 15-keto (oxo) metabolite.

Prostaglandins have a critical role in the signaling pathways that are involved in reproduction (establishment of pregnancy, maintenance of pregnancy, and initiation of labor), blood pressure homeostasis (vasoconstriction and vasodilation), sexual dimorphism, and the immune system (inflammation). HPGD has a critical role in the regulation of prostaglandin expression.

== Defects in 15-HPGD ==
15-HPGD has an unappreciated role in the maintenance of pregnancy. In mice, 15-HPDG has been shown to have essential roles in prevention of early termination of pregnancy and maternal morbidity. In 15-HPGD knockout mice, early pregnancy termination was detected. 15-HPGD KO mice that were able to establish pregnancy, lost pregnancy by gestation day ~8.5. At time of pregnancy loss, 15-HPGD KO mice have normal levels of PGE2, increased levels of PGF2α and decreasing levels of serum progesterone.

A hypomorphic mutation of 15-HPGD causes mice to enter labor ~ a full day earlier when compared to their wild-type littermates, due to elevated circulating PGF2α concentrations. Furthermore, it was concluded that 15-HPGD has a critical role in determining the timing of labor

== See also ==
- Primary hypertrophic osteoathropathy
