= Periostitis =

Inflammation of the periosteum membrane surrounding bones

- Specialty: Rheumatology

Periostitis, also known as periostalgia, is a medical condition caused by inflammation of the periosteum, a layer of connective tissue that surrounds bone. The condition is most commonly chronic, and is marked by tenderness and swelling of the bone and pain.

== Causes ==
Acute periostitis is due to infection, characterized by diffuse formation of pus, severe pain, and constitutional symptoms, and usually results in necrosis. It can be caused by excessive physical activity as well, as in the case of medial tibial stress syndrome (also referred to as tibial periostalgia, soleus periostalgia, or shin splints). Congenital infection with syphilis can also cause periostitis in newborn infants. Hypertrophic osteoarthropathy can also cause periostitis.

== History ==
Evidence for periostitis found in the fossil record is studied by paleopathologists, specialists in ancient disease and injury. Periostitis has been seen in the late Cretaceous-Eocene crocodile Borealosuchus formidabilis, once known as Leidyosuchus. In one study, periostitis was the most common pathology in this species, with 134 instances of the condition out of 7,154 bones the scientists examined showing evidence for the condition. Periostitis has also been documented in dinosaurs, including a forelimb referred to as the long-necked Camarasaurus grandis, as well as the shoulder blade of a horned dinosaur.

== See also ==
- Periosteal reaction
