= Hypertrophic osteopathy =

Bone disease

Hypertrophic osteopathy is a bone disease characterized by new bone formation on the outside of the diaphyses of long bones of the limbs, without destruction of cortical bone, resembling excess periosteal reaction. Symptoms include stiffness and warm, firm swelling of the legs, and signs of lung disease such as coughing and difficulty breathing.

== Causes ==
The most common cause in dogs is primary or metastatic pulmonary neoplasia. Other potential causes in dogs include heartworm disease, shunting heart disease, and pulmonary abscesses (from infection by e.g. Mycobacterium fortuitum, Corynebacterium, Eikenella corrodens). It has also been associated with nonpulmonary diseases such as renal tumors and rhabdomyosarcoma of the bladder. At least once it has been caused by congenital megaesophagus in a six-year-old dog.

Hypertrophic osteopathy is rare in cats.

Human cases are most commonly caused by lung tumors, though there is a longer list of causes. See Nail clubbing § Causes.

== Pathogenesis ==
One theory is that hypertrophic osteopathy is caused by increased blood flow to the ends of the legs, overgrowth of connective tissue, and then new bone formation surrounding the bones. This is secondary to nerve stimulation by the lung disease. The condition may reverse if the lung mass is removed or if the vagus nerve is cut on the affected side.

In humans nail clubbing and hypertrophic osteoarthropathy are generally attributed to an excess of VEGF, a growth factor produced by cancer cells for growth and by platelets in hypoxic conditions.

== See also ==
- Hypertrophic pulmonary osteoarthropathy
