= Leo Schamroth =

South African cardiologist (1924–1988)

- Born: 2 June 1924; Antwerp, Belgium
- Died: 24 May 1988 (aged 63); Johannesburg, South Africa
- Education: University of the Witwatersrand Medical School
- Known for: Electrocardiography; Schamroth's window test
- Spouse(s): Beckey Schamroth, Renee Schamroth
- Scientific career
- Fields: Cardiology

Leo Schamroth FRSSAf (2 June 1924 – 24 May 1988) was a South African cardiologist remembered for his work in electrocardiography and for describing Schamroth's window test.

== Biography ==
Schamroth was born in Belgium and emigrated to South Africa in infancy. He graduated from the University of the Witwatersrand Medical School (WitsMed) in 1948. He went to Britain for post-graduate studies and returned to South Africa to complete his registrarship at Johannesburg General Hospital. He joined the university staff based at the Baragwanath Hospital in 1956 as a specialist physician. In 1965 he was awarded a Doctorate of Medicine and in 1970 a Doctorate in Science. He became Professor of Medicine at WitsMed and chief physician at Baragwanath Hospital in 1972. Baragwanath Hospital is the largest in the southern hemisphere and claimed to be the third largest in the world. He held those positions until his retirement on 31 October 1987 owing to ill health. He continued to write, teach and lecture as Professor of Medicine at WitsMed and abroad.

== Works ==
Despite the lack of a cardiology unit at Baragwanath Hospital, Schamroth made important contributions to the field of cardiology. He published over 300 papers and eight textbooks, mostly concerned with electrocardiology. In 1957 he published An Introduction to Electrocardiography. It ran to seven editions and was translated into Spanish, Italian, Greek, Turkish, and Japanese while also being the most frequently stolen book from medical libraries in the world.

He wrote two other textbooks, The Disorders of Cardiac Rhythm and The Electrocardiology of Coronary Artery Disease which were translated into Italian and Spanish. His final work, Twelve Lead Electrocardiography was published posthumously in four volumes in 1969.

== Private life ==
Schamroth was married to Beckey and had four sons, all of whom became physicians, but only one a cardiologist. He then married Renee who had four children too.

== Acknowledgments and memberships ==
- Fellow of the Royal College of Physicians of Edinburgh
- Fellow of the College of Physicians of Glasgow
- Fellow of the American College of Cardiology
- Fellow of the Royal Society of South Africa
- 1972 Master Teacher Award by the American College of Cardiology
- 1984 Honorary M.D. by the University of Cape Town
- Osler Award and Sodi Award from the University of Miami for "excellence in teaching clinical cardiology"
- 1983 Honoured at the 50th Grand Oriente de Belgique, Antwerp
- Claude Harris Leon Foundation Award of Merit
- WITS Alumni Award
