= Hypertrophic osteoarthropathy =

Bone and joint disorder

- Other names: Hypertrophic pulmonary osteoarthropathy, Bamberger–Marie syndrome, osteoarthropathia hypertrophicans
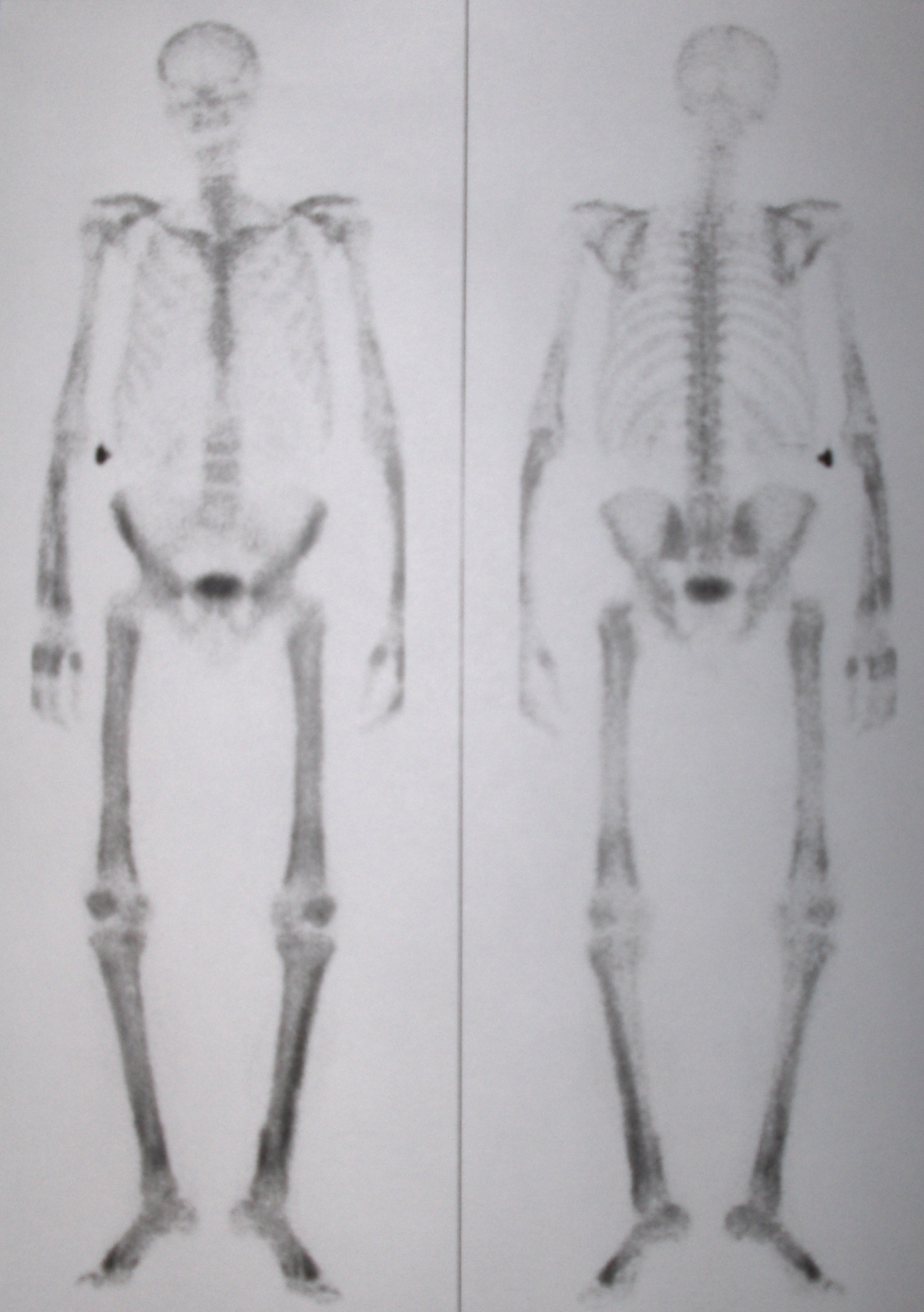
- Bonescan of a person with hypertrophic osteoarthropathy
- Specialty: Rheumatology

Hypertrophic osteoarthropathy is a medical condition combining clubbing and periostitis of the small hand joints, especially the distal interphalangeal joints and the metacarpophalangeal joints. Distal expansion of the long bones as well as painful, swollen joints and synovial villous proliferation are often seen. The condition may occur alone (primary), or it may be secondary to diseases like lung cancer. Among patients with lung cancer, it is most associated with adenocarcinoma and least associated with small cell lung cancer. These patients often get clubbing and increased bone deposition on long bones. Their presenting signs and symptoms are sometimes only clubbing and painful ankles.

== Cause ==
Hypertrophic osteoarthropathy is one of many distant effect disorders due to cancer, with lung cancer being the most common cause but also occurring with ovarian or adrenal malignancies. A distant effect disorder, or a paraneoplastic syndrome, affects distant areas and thus is not related to local compression or obstruction effects from the tumor. Other paraneoplastic syndromes include hypercalcemia, SIADH, Cushing's syndrome and a variety of neurological disorders. Thought to be due to fibrovascular proliferation caused by accumulation of megakaryocytes in the digital vessels which are normally filtered by the lungs.

Subclassifications with specific causes:

- Hypertrophic pulmonary osteoarthropathy
- Pachydermoperiostosis

== Diagnosis ==
People with hypertrophic osteoarthropathy may have bone scans showing parallel lines of activity along the cortex of the shafts and ends of tibiae, femurs and radii; especially around the knees, ankles and wrists. This activity may decrease after treatment of the underlying cause.

== Treatment ==
Non-steroidal anti-inflammatory drugs (NSAIDs) can give significant relief of the symptoms. Treatment of lung cancer or other causes of hypertrophic osteoarthropathy results in regression of symptoms for some patients.

Debilitating symptoms can be relieved using the COX-2 inhibitor rofecoxib. The symptoms recur on discontinuation of the drug.

Octreotide, which reduces VEGF production, is beneficial.

== Etymology ==
The eponymous 'Bamberger–Marie syndrome' is named for Austrian internist Eugen von Bamberger and French neurologist Pierre Marie.

== See also ==
- Periosteal reaction
- Hypertrophic osteopathy
