= SLCO2A1 =

Protein-coding gene in the species Homo sapiens

An Error has occurred retrieving Wikidata item for infobox Solute carrier organic anion transporter family member 2A1, also known as the prostaglandin transporter (PGT), is a protein that in humans is encoded by the SLCO2A1 gene.

This gene encodes a prostaglandin transporter that is a member of the 12-membrane-spanning organic anion-transporting polypeptide superfamily of transporters. The encoded protein may be involved in mediating the uptake and clearance of prostaglandins in numerous tissues.

== Clinical relevance ==
Mutations in this gene have been shown to cause primary hypertrophic osteoarthropathy, specific form of chronic enteropathy.
