= Benzothiadiazine =

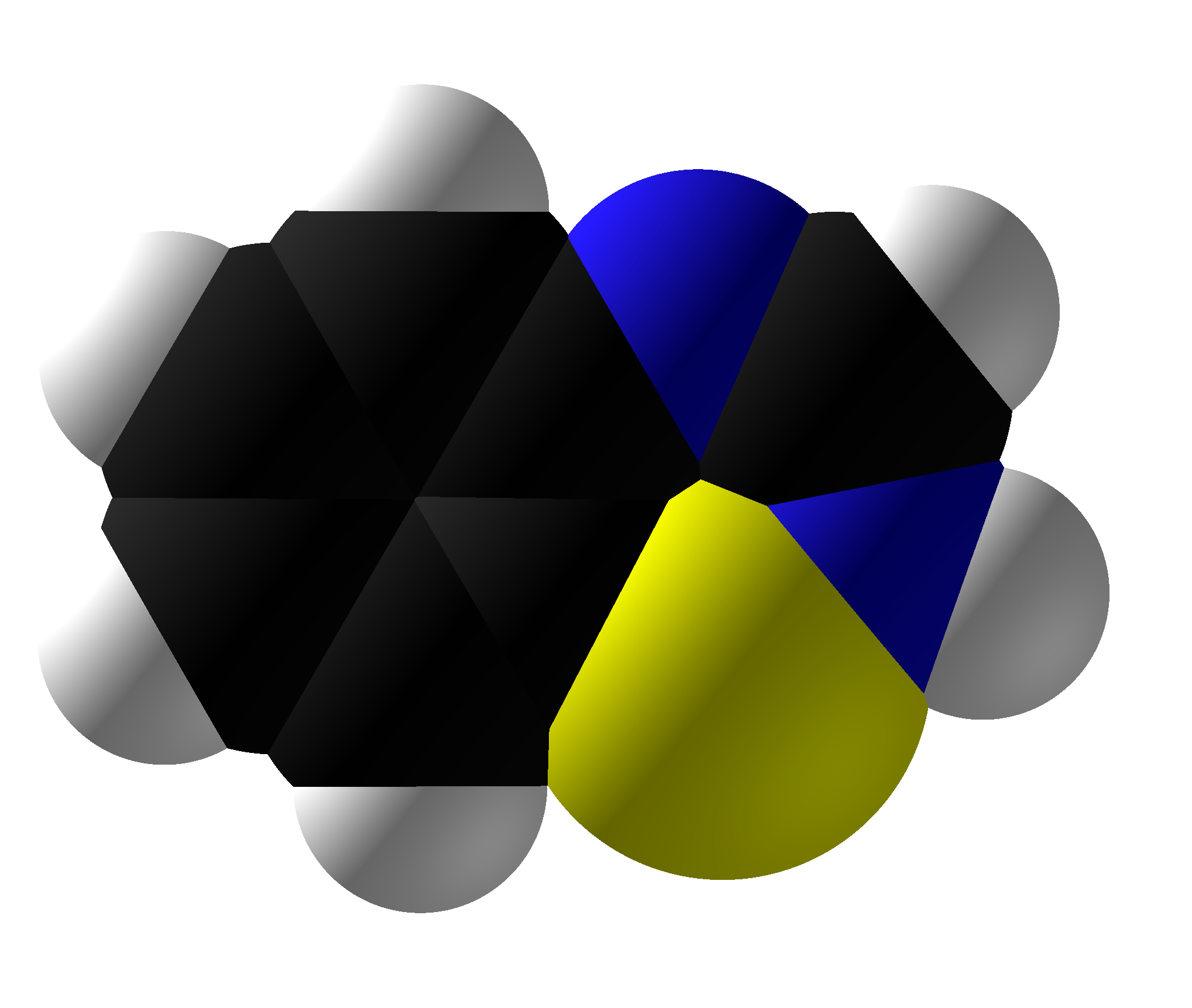

Names
- Preferred IUPAC name 2H-1,2,4-Benzothiadiazine

Identifiers
CAS Number	255-18-5
3D model (JSmol)	Interactive image
ChemSpider	10660057
PubChem CID	473368
UNII	X7JFP65SVP
CompTox Dashboard (EPA)	DTXSID50332969
- InChI: InChI=1S/C7H6N2S/c1-2-4-7-6(3-1)5-8-9-10-7/h1-5,9H Key: HAVZTGSQJIEKPI-UHFFFAOYSA-N; InChI=1/C7H6N2S/c1-2-4-7-6(3-1)5-8-9-10-7/h1-5,9H Key: HAVZTGSQJIEKPI-UHFFFAOYAH
- SMILES: c1ccc2SN\N=C/c2c1

Properties
Chemical formula	C_{7}H_{6}N_{2}S
Molar mass	150.20 g·mol^{−1}
- Except where otherwise noted, data are given for materials in their standard state (at 25 °C [77 °F], 100 kPa). verify (what is ?) Infobox references

Benzothiadiazine is a chemical compound that consists of a benzene ring fused to a thiadiazine ring. Thiadiazine in turn is a six-membered heterocycle composed of three carbon atoms, one sulfur atom, and two nitrogen atoms.

Some benzothiadiazine derivatives are used as pharmaceutical drugs, including:

- bendroflumethiazide
- chlorothiazide
- cyclothiazide
- hydrochlorothiazide
- diazoxide

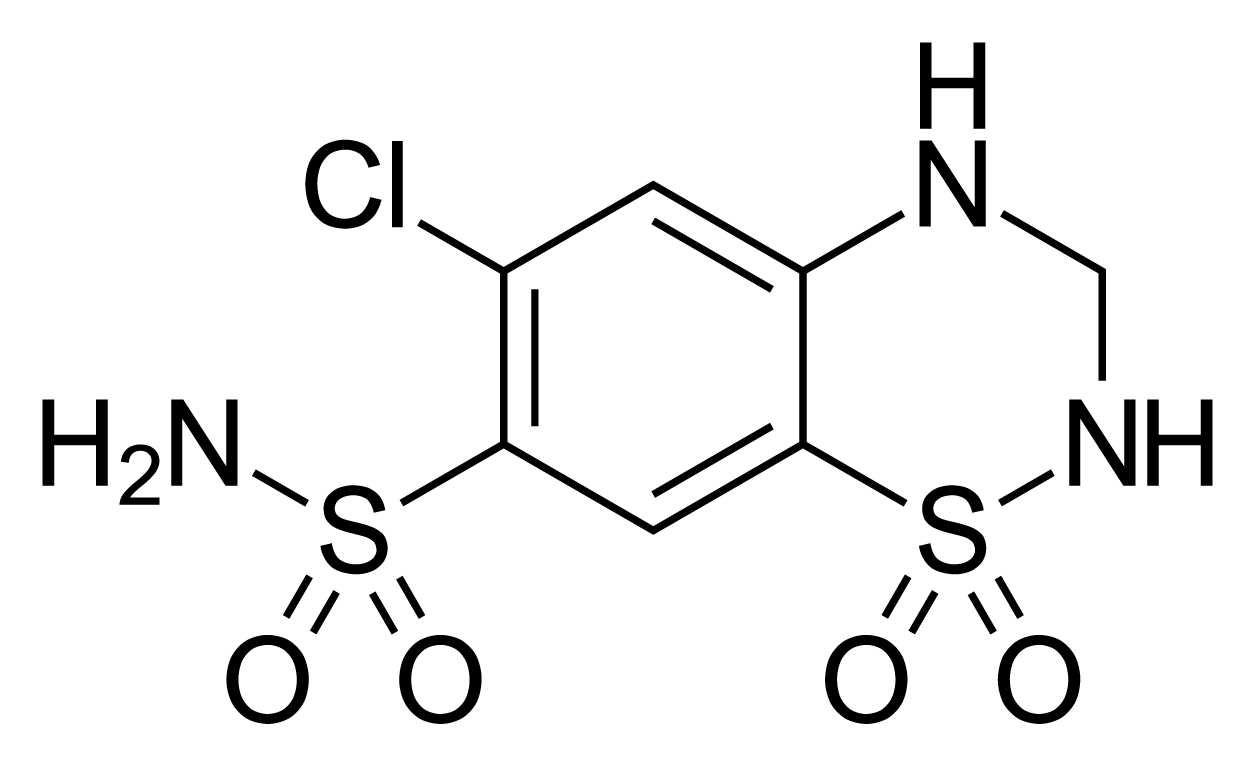
Hydrochlorothiazide, a benzothiadiazine derivative used as a diuretic
