= Novartis =

Swiss multinational pharmaceutical corporation

Novartis AG

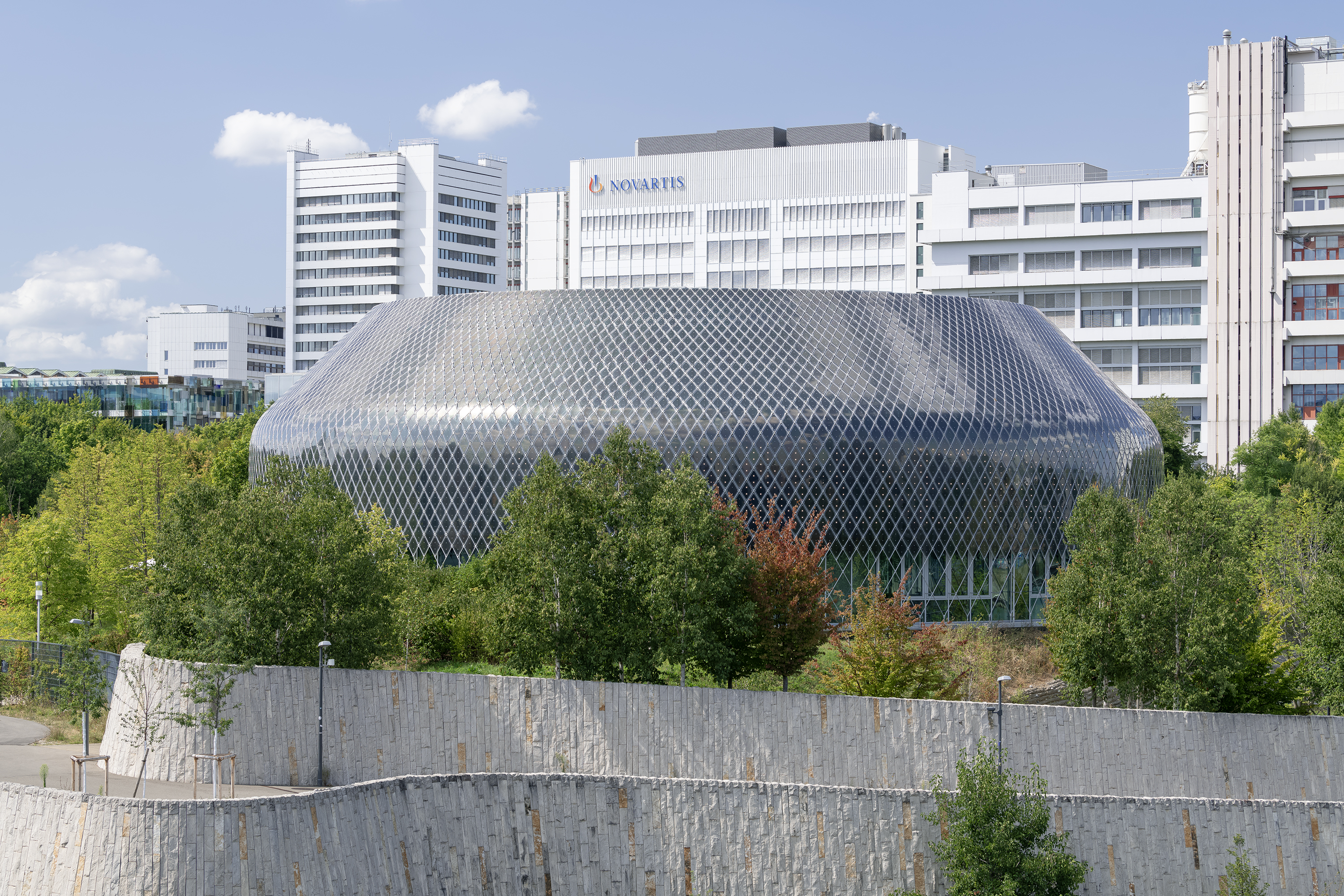
- Campus (headquarters) and the Novartis Pavilion in Basel
- Type: Public
- Traded as: SIX: NOVN; SMI component; NYSE: NVS (ADR)
- ISIN: CH0012005267
- Industry: Pharmaceuticals
- Predecessors: Ciba-Geigy; Sandoz (via merger)
- Founded: 20 December 1996; 29 years ago (from merger)
- Founders: Johann Rudolf; Alexander Clavel
- Headquarters: Basel, Switzerland (47.5744252°N 7.5764914°E)
- Area served: Worldwide
- Key people: Vasant Narasimhan (CEO); Giovanni Caforio (chairman)
- Products: Pharmaceutical drugs, generic drugs, over-the-counter drugs, vaccines, diagnostics, contact lenses, animal health (list...)
- Revenue: ▲US$50.32 billion (2024)
- Operating income: ▲US$14.54 billion (2024)
- Net income: ▼US$11.94 billion (2024)
- Total assets: ▲US$101.2 billion (2024)
- Total equity: ▼US$44.13 billion (2024)
- Number of employees: 75,883 (2024)
- Website: novartis.com

Novartis AG is a Swiss multinational pharmaceutical corporation based in Basel, Switzerland. Novartis is one of the largest pharmaceutical companies in the world and was the eighth largest by revenue in 2024.

Novartis manufactures the drugs clozapine (Clozaril), diclofenac (Voltaren; sold to GlaxoSmithKline in 2015 deal), carbamazepine (Tegretol), valsartan (Diovan), imatinib mesylate (Gleevec/Glivec), cyclosporine (Neoral/Sandimmune), letrozole (Femara), methylphenidate (Ritalin; produced by Sandoz since 2023), terbinafine (Lamisil), deferasirox (Exjade), and others.

Novartis was formed in 1996 by the merger of Ciba-Geigy and Sandoz. It was considered the largest corporate merger in history during that time. The pharmaceutical and agrochemical divisions of both companies formed Novartis as an independent entity. The name Novartis was based on the Latin terms, novae artes (new skills).

After the merger, other Ciba-Geigy and Sandoz businesses were sold, or, like Ciba Specialty Chemicals, spun off as independent companies. The Sandoz brand disappeared for three years, but was revived in 2003 when Novartis consolidated its generic drugs businesses into a single subsidiary and named it Sandoz. Novartis divested its agrochemical and genetically modified crops business in 2000 with the spinout of Syngenta in partnership with AstraZeneca, which also divested its agrochemical business. The new company also acquired a series of acquisitions in order to strengthen its core businesses.

Novartis is a full member of the European Federation of Pharmaceutical Industries and Associations (EFPIA), the Biotechnology Innovation Organization (BIO), the International Federation of Pharmaceutical Manufacturers and Associations (IFPMA), and the Pharmaceutical Research and Manufacturers of America (PhRMA). Novartis is the third most valuable pharmaceutical company in Europe, after Novo and Roche.

== History ==
Novartis was created in March 1996 and began operations on 20 December from the merger of Ciba-Geigy and Sandoz Laboratories, both Swiss companies.

=== Ciba-Geigy ===
Ciba-Geigy was formed in 1970 by the merger of J. R. Geigy Ltd (founded in Basel in 1857) and CIBA (founded in Basel in 1859).

Ciba began in 1859, when Alexander Clavel (1805–1873) took up the production of fuchsine in his factory for silk-dyeing works in Basel. By 1873, he sold his dye factory to the company Bindschedler and Busch. In 1884, Bindschedler and Busch was transformed into a joint-stock company named "Gesellschaft für Chemische Industrie Basel" (Company for Chemical Industry Basel). The acronym, CIBA, was adopted as the company's name in 1945.

The foundation for Geigy was established in 1857, when Johann Rudolf Geigy-Merian (1830–1917) and Johann Muller-Pack acquired a site in Basel, where they built a dyewood mill and a dye extraction plant. Two years later, they began the production of synthetic fuchsine. In 1901, they formed the public limited company Geigy, and the name of the company was changed to J. R. Geigy Ltd in 1914.

CIBA and Geigy merged in 1970 to form Ciba‑Geigy Ltd. /ˌsiːbə ˈɡaɪɡi/.

=== Mid-1990s controversy ===
In the mid-1990s, state and federal health and environmental agencies identified an increased incidence of childhood cancers in Toms River, New Jersey, from the 1970–1995 period. Multiple investigations by state and federal environmental and health agencies indicated that the likely source of the increased cancer risk was contamination from Toms River Chemical Plant (then operated by Ciba-Geigy), which had been in operation since 1952, and the Reich Farm/Union Carbide. The area was designated a United States Environmental Protection Agency Superfund site in 1983 after an underground plume of toxic chemicals was identified. The following year, a discharge pipe was shut down for repairs and extended out to sea past the barrier islands after a sinkhole at the corner of Bay Avenue and Vaughn Avenue revealed that it had been leaking. After law suites and increasing pressure from the New Jersey Department of Environmental Protection, the plant was shut down in 1996. A follow-up study from the 1996–2000 period indicated that while there were more cancer cases than expected, rates had significantly fallen. Since 1996, the Toms River water system has been subject to the most stringent water testing in New Jersey and is considered safe for consumption. Dan Fagin's Toms River: A Story of Science and Salvation, the 2014 Pulitzer Prize winning book, examined the issue of industrial pollution at the site in detail.

=== Sandoz ===
The Sandoz brand exists today as a subsidiary of Novartis.

Sandoz is the generic drugs division of Novartis. Before the 1996 merger with Ciba-Geigy to form Novartis, Sandoz Pharmaceuticals (Sandoz AG) was a pharmaceutical company headquartered in Basel, Switzerland (as was Ciba-Geigy), and was best known for developing drugs such as Sandimmune for organ transplantation, the antipsychotic Clozaril, Mellaril Tablets and Serentil Tablets for treating psychiatric disorders, and Cafergot Tablets and Torecan Suppositories for treating migraine headaches.

The Chemiefirma Kern und Sandoz ("Kern and Sandoz Chemistry Firm") was founded in 1886 by Alfred Kern (1850–1893) and Edouard Sandoz (1853–1928). The first dyes manufactured by them were alizarinblue and auramine. After Kern's death, the partnership became the corporation Chemische Fabrik vormals Sandoz in 1895. The company began producing the fever-reducing drug antipyrin in the same year. In 1899, the company began producing the sugar substitute saccharin. Further pharmaceutical research began in 1917 under Arthur Stoll (1887–1971), who is the founder of Sandoz's pharmaceutical department in 1917. In 1918, Arthur Stoll isolated ergotamine from ergot; the substance was eventually used to treat migraine and headaches and was introduced under the trade name Gynergen in 1921.

Between the World Wars, Gynergen (1921) and Calcium-Sandoz (1929) were brought to market. Sandoz also produced chemicals for textiles, paper, and leather, beginning in 1929. In 1939, the company began producing agricultural chemicals.

The psychedelic effects of lysergic acid diethylamide (LSD) were discovered at the Sandoz laboratories in 1943 by Arthur Stoll and Albert Hofmann. Sandoz began clinical trials and marketed the substance, from 1947 through the mid-1960s, under the name Delysid as a psychiatric drug, thought useful for treating a wide variety of mental ailments, ranging from alcoholism to sexual deviancy. Sandoz suggested in its marketing literature that psychiatrists take LSD themselves, to gain a better subjective understanding of the schizophrenic experience, and many did exactly that and so did other scientific researchers. The Sandoz product received mass publicity as early as 1954, in a Time magazine feature. Research on LSD peaked in the 1950s and early 1960s. The CIA purchased quantities of LSD from Sandoz for use in its illegal human experimentation program known as MKUltra. Sandoz withdrew the drug from the market in 1965. The drug became a cultural novelty of the 1960s after psychologist Timothy Leary at Harvard University began to promote its use for recreational and spiritual experiences among the general public.

Sandoz opened its first foreign offices in 1964. In 1967, Sandoz merged with Wander AG (known for Ovomaltine and Isostar). Sandoz acquired the companies Delmark, Wasabröd (a Swedish manufacturer of crisp bread), and Gerber Products Company (a baby food company). On 1 November 1986, a fire broke out in a production plant storage room, which led to the Sandoz chemical spill and a large amount of pesticide being released into the upper Rhine river. This exposure killed many fish and other aquatic life. In 1995, Sandoz spun off its specialty chemicals business to form Clariant. In 1997, Clariant merged with the specialty chemicals business that was spun off from Hoechst AG in Germany.

=== Merger ===
In 1996, Ciba-Geigy merged with Sandoz, with the pharmaceutical and agrochemical divisions of both staying together to form Novartis. Other Ciba-Geigy and Sandoz businesses were spun off as independent companies. notably Ciba Specialty Chemicals. Sandoz's Master Builders Technologies, a producer of chemicals for the construction industry, was sold off to SKW Trostberg A.G., a subsidiary of the German energy company VIAG, while its North American corn herbicide business became part of the German chemical maker BASF.

=== Post-merger ===
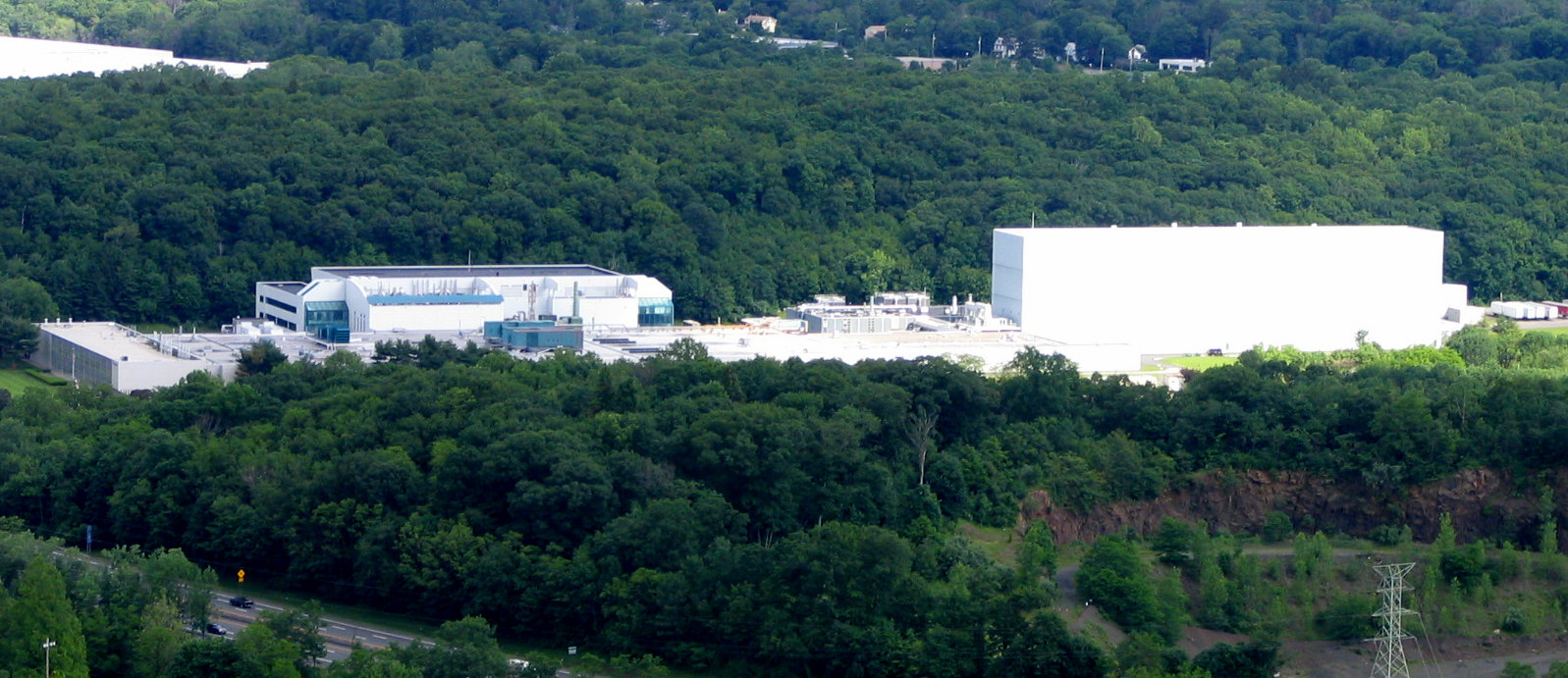
Suffern, New York: one of the Novartis pharmaceutical production facilities in the United States

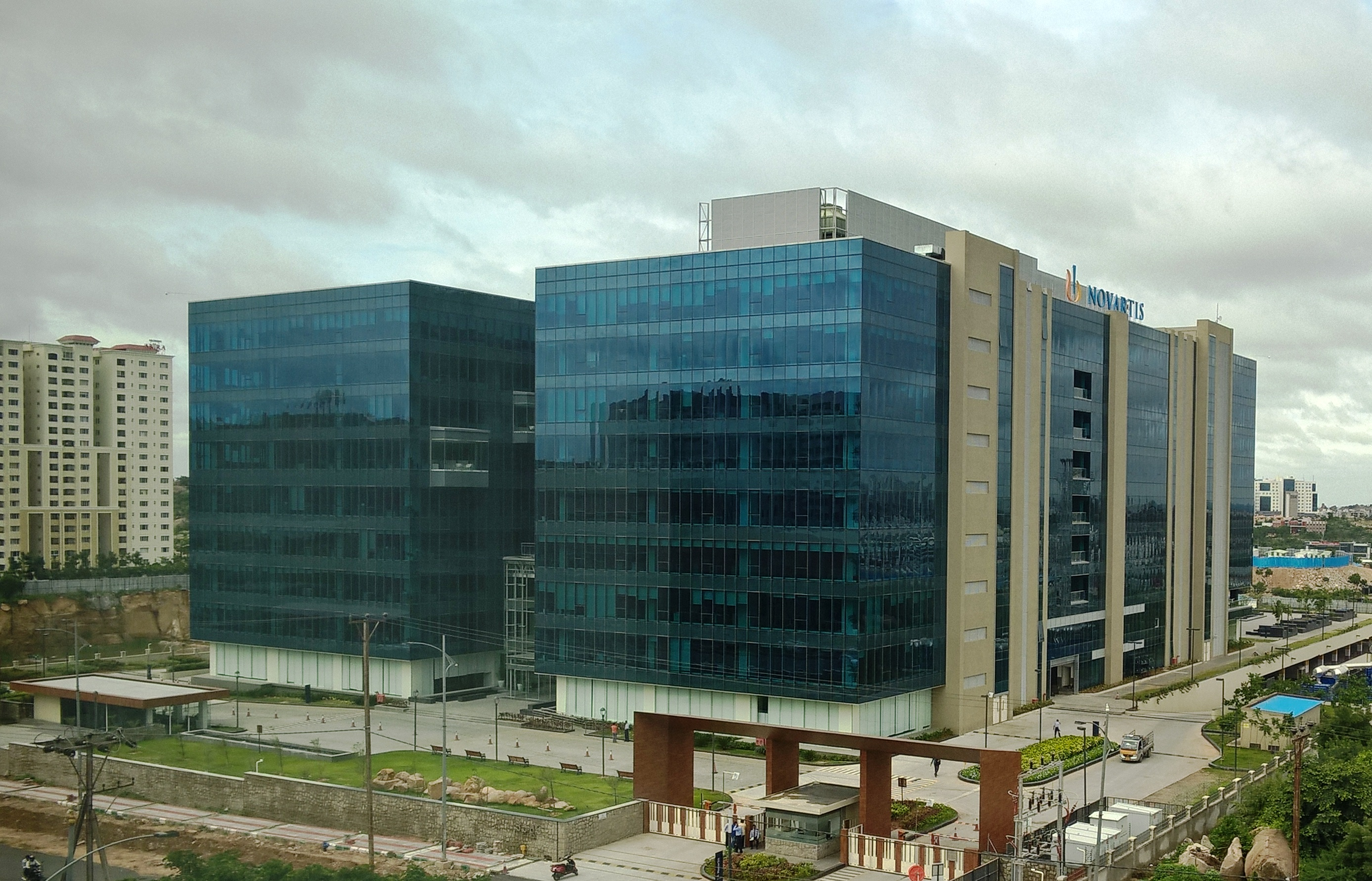
Novartis Knowledge Center headquarters in HITEC City, Hyderabad, India

In 1998, the company entered into a biotechnology licensing agreement with the University of California at Berkeley Department of Plant and Microbial Biology. Critics of the agreement expressed concern over prospects that the agreement would diminish academic objectivity, or lead to the commercialization of genetically modified plants. The agreement expired in 2003.

==== 2000–2010 ====
In 2000, Novartis and AstraZeneca combined their agrobusiness divisions to create a new company, Syngenta.

In 2003, Novartis organized all its generics businesses into one division, and merged some of its subsidiaries into one company, reusing the predecessor brand name of Sandoz.

In 2005, Novartis expanded its subsidiary Sandoz significantly through the US$8.29 billion acquisition of Hexal, one of Germany's leading generic drug companies, and Eon Labs, a fast-growing United States generic pharmaceutical company.

In 2006, Novartis acquired the California-based Chiron Corporation. Chiron had been divided into three units: Chiron Vaccines, Chiron Blood Testing, and Chiron BioPharmaceuticals. The biopharmaceutical unit was integrated into Novartis Pharmaceuticals, while the vaccines and blood testing units were made into a new Novartis Vaccines and Diagnostics division. Also in 2006, Sandoz became the first company to have a biosimilar drug approved in Europe with its recombinant human growth hormone drug.

In 2007, Novartis sold the Gerber Products Company to Nestlé as part of its continuing effort to shed old Sandoz and Ciba-Geigy businesses and focus on healthcare.

In 2009, Novartis reached an agreement to acquire an 85 percent stake in the Chinese vaccines company Zhejiang Tianyuan Bio-Pharmaceutical Co., Ltd. as part of a strategic initiative to build a vaccines industry leader in this country and expand the group's limited presence in this fast-growing market segment. This proposed acquisition will require government and regulatory approvals in China.

In 2010, Novartis offered to pay US$39.3 billion to fully acquire Alcon, the world's largest eye-care company, including a majority stake held by Nestlé. Novartis had bought 25 percent of Alcon in 2008. Novartis created a new division and called it Alcon, under which it placed its CIBA VISION subsidiary and Novartis Ophthalmics, which became the second-largest division of Novartis. The total cost for Alcon amounted to $60 billion.

==== 2011–present ====
In 2011, Novartis acquired the medical laboratory diagnostics company Genoptix to "serve as a strong foundation for our (Novartis') individualized treatment programs".

In 2012, the Company cut approximately 2,000 positions in the United States, primarily in sales, in response to anticipated revenue downturns from the hypertension drug Diovan, which was losing patent protection, and the realization that the anticipated successor to Diovan, Rasilez, was failing in clinical trials. The 2012 personnel reductions follow ~2000 cut positions in Switzerland and the United States in 2011, ~1400 cut positions in the United States in 2010, and a reduction of "thousands" and several site closures in previous years. Also in 2012, Novartis became the biggest manufacturer of generic skin care medicine, after agreeing to buy Fougera Pharmaceuticals for $1.525 billion in cash.

In 2013, the Indian Supreme Court issued a decision rejecting Novartis' patent application in India on the final form of Gleevec, Novartis's cancer drug; the case caused great controversy. In 2013, Novartis was sued again by the US government, this time for allegedly bribing doctors for a decade so that their patients are steered towards the company's drugs.

In January 2014, Novartis announced plans to cut 500 jobs from its pharmaceuticals division. In February 2014, Novartis announced that it acquired CoStim Pharmaceuticals.

In May 2014, Novartis purchased the rights to market Ophthotech's Fovista (an anti-PDGF aptamer, also being investigated for use in combination with anti-VEGF treatments) outside the U.S. for up to $1 billion. Novartis acquired exclusive rights to market the eye drug outside of the states while retaining U.S. marketing rights. The company agreed to pay Ophthotech $200 million upfront, and $130 million in milestone payments relating to Phase III trials. Ophthotech is also eligible to receive up to $300 million dependent upon future marketing approval milestones outside of America and up to $400 million relating to sales milestones. In September 2014, Ophthotech received its first $50 million phase III trial milestone payment from Novartis. In April 2014, Novartis announced that it would acquire GlaxoSmithKline's cancer drug business for $16 billion as well as selling its vaccines business to GlaxoSmithKline for $7.1 billion. In August 2014 Genetic Engineering & Biotechnology News reported that Novartis had acquired a 15 percent stake in Gamida Cell for $35 million, with the option to purchase the whole company for approximately $165 million. In October 2014, Novartis announced its intention to sell its influenza vaccine business (inclusive of its development pipeline), subject to regulatory approval, to CSL for $275 million.

In March 2015, the company announced BioPharma had completed its acquisition of two Phase III cancer-drug candidates; the MEK inhibitor binimetinib (MEK 162) and the BRAF inhibitor encorafenib (LGX818), for $85 million. In addition, the company sold its RNAi portfolio to Arrowhead Research for $10 million and $25 million in stock. In June, the company announced it would acquire Spinifex Pharmaceuticals for more than $200 million. In August, the company acquired the remaining rights to the CD20 monoclonal antibody Ofatumumab from GlaxoSmithKline for up to $1 billion. In October the company acquired Admune Therapeutics for an undisclosed sum, as well as licensing PBF-509, an adenosine A2A receptor antagonist which is in Phase I clinical trials for non-small cell lung cancer, from Palobiofarma.

In November 2016, the company announced it would acquire Selexys Pharmaceuticals for $665 million. In December, the company acquired Encore Vision, gaining the company's principle compound, EV06, is a first-in-class topical therapy for presbyopia. In December Novartis acquired Ziarco Group Limited, bolstering its presence in eczema treatments.

In late October 2017, Reuters announced that Novartis would acquire Advanced Accelerator Applications for $3.9 billion, paying $41 per ordinary share and $82 per American depositary share representing a 47 percent premium.

In March 2018, GlaxoSmithKline announced that it has reached an agreement with Novartis to acquire Novartis' 36.5 percent stake in their Consumer Healthcare Joint Venture for $13 billion (£9.2 billion). In April of the same year, the business utilised some of the proceeds from the aforementioned GlaxoSmithKline deal to acquire Avexis for $218 per share or $8.7 billion in total, gaining the lead compound AVXS-101 used to treat spinal muscular atrophy. In August 2018, Novartis signed a deal with Laekna-a Shanghai-based pharmaceutical company for its two clinical-stage cancer drugs. Novartis gave Laekna the exclusive international rights for the drugs that are oral pan-Akt kinase inhibitors namely; afuresertib (ASB138) and uprosertib (UPB795). In mid-October, the company announced it would acquire Endocyte Inc for $2.1 billion ($24 per share) merging it with a newly created subsidiary. Endocyte will bolster Novartis' offering in its radiopharmaceuticals business, with Endocyte's first in class candidate ^{177}Lu-PSMA-617 being targeted against metastatic castration-resistant prostate cancer. In late December the company announced it would acquire France-based contract manufacturer, CellforCure from LFB, boosting its capacity to produce cell and gene therapies.

On 9 April 2019, Novartis announced that it had completed the spin-off of Alcon as a separate commercial entity. Alcon was listed on the SIX exchange in Switzerland and NYSE exchange in the U.S. Novartis announced during late 2019 a five-year artificial intelligence "alliance" with Microsoft. The companies aim to create applications for "Microsoft's AI capabilities", in turn improving the other's drug development processes. Microsoft seeks to "test AI products it is already working on in 'real-life' situations". The deal will pursue solutions for "organizing and using" data generated from Novartis' laboratory experiments, clinical trials, and manufacturing plants. It will also look at improving manufacturing of Chimeric antigen receptor T cell (CAR T cells). Finally, the deal "will also apply AI to generative chemistry to enhance drug design". In November 2019, Sandoz announced it would acquire the Japanese business of Aspen Global inc for €300 million (around $330 million), boosting the business's presence in Asia. In late November 2019, the business announced it would acquire The Medicines Company for US$9.7 billion ($85 per share) in order to acquire amongst other assets, the cholesterol lowering therapy; inclisiran.

In April 2020, the company announced it would acquire Amblyotech.

In September 2020, Novartis was imposed a fine of €385 million by the French competition authority on accusations of abusive practices to preserve sales of Lucentis over a cheaper drug. Also in September, BioNTech has leased a large production facility from Novartis to follow all advance demands for its coronavirus vaccine in Europe and sell it to China.

In July 2020, Novartis agreed to pay $678 million to settle allegations that the company violated the False Claims Act and Anti-Kickback Statute by paying physicians to induce them to prescribe certain of the company's drugs. Novartis allegedly spent hundreds of millions of dollars on fraudulent speaker programs that served as a means to bribe doctors with cash payments and other extravagant rewards. Many of these speaking programs were allegedly nothing more than social gatherings at expensive restaurants, with limited or no discussion about the Novartis drugs.

In October Novartis announced it would acquire Vedere Bio for $280 million boosting the businesses cell and gene therapy offerings.

In October 2020, as part of a joint venture to develop therapeutic drugs to combat COVID-19, Novartis bought 6% of all shares outstanding in Swiss DARPin research company Molecular Partners AG at CHF 23 per share.

In December 2020, Novartis announced it would acquire Cadent Therapeutics for up to $770 million, gaining full rights to CAD-9303 (a NMDAr positive allosteric modulator), MIJ-821 (a NMDAr negative allosteric modulator) and CAD-1883 a clinical-stage SK channel positive allosteric modulator.

In September 2021, the company announced it would acquire gene-therapy business, Arctos Medical, broadening its optogenetics range. In December, Novartis announced it would purchase Gyroscope Therapeutics from health care investment company, Syncona Ltd, for up to $1.5 billion.

In February 2022, New York City-based biotechnology company Cambrian Biopharma announced it had licensed rights to mTOR inhibitor programs from Novartis. As part of the deal, Cambrian was setting up a subsidiary called Tornado Therapeutics.

In August 2022, the company announced its plan to spin off Sandoz generic drugs unit to form a publicly traded business as part of a restructuring. With the unit having generated US$9.69 billion in 2021, the spin-off would create the biggest generic drugs company in Europe by sales.

In June 2023, Novartis announced it would acquire Chinook Therapeutics and its drug pipeline for up to $3.5 billion.

In July 2023, Novartis acquired DTx Pharma, a developer of technology for delivering RNA-based therapies, upfront for $500 million and an additional $500 million subject to reaching certain targets. Also in June, Novartis announced it would it would sell Xiidra to Bausch & Lomb for $1.75 billion and receive additional $750 million linked to future sales for Xiidra as well as two pipeline assets.

In September 2023, Novartis announced that the spin-off had been approved by its shareholders and that it would be completed by the next month, resulting in Novartis shareholders receiving one Sandoz share for every five Novartis shares. Sandoz will be listed on the SIX Swiss Exchange with a market capitalization between $18 billion and $25bn.

On 4 October 2023, Novartis completed the spin-off of Sandoz as a stand-alone company.

In November 2023, Legend Biotech and Novartis signed an out-license deal to develop and manufacture Legend's chimeric antigen receptor (CAR-T) therapies, that go after delta-like ligand protein 3 (DLL3) including large cell neuroendocrine carcinoma candidate LB2102 for $100 million upfront, and Legend Biotech will be eligible to receive up to $1.01 billion in clinical, regulatory, and commercial milestone payments and tiered royalties.

In December 2023, Novartis sold its 15 ophthalmology drugs to JB Chemicals for ₹1,089 crore ($116 million).

In 2023, the World Intellectual Property Organization (WIPO)’s Madrid Yearly Review ranked Novartis's number of marks applications filled under the Madrid System as 4th in the world, with 110 trademarks applications submitted during 2023.

In February 2024, Novartis announced it would acquire the German biotech firm MorphoSys AG for €2.7bn. Germany's antitrust regulator, the Federal Cartel Office, approved the takeover in March 2024.

In May 2024, Novartis announced it would acquire Mariana Oncology for $1 billion upfront and up to $750 million more if certain milestones were met.

In July 2024, Novartis entered into a strategic collaboration with Dren Bio to develop therapeutic bispecific antibodies for cancer, with the deal worth up to $3 billion.

In November 2024, Novartis and Ratio Therapeutics entered into a worldwide licence and collaboration agreement worth $745m to advance a somatostatin receptor 2 (SSTR2)-targeting radiotherapeutic candidate for cancer.

In February 2025, Novartis announced the acquisition of Anthos Therapeutics for $925m.

In April 2025, Novartis announced plans to spend $23 billion to build and expand 10 facilities in the USA.

In April 2025, Novartis agreed to buy Regulus Therapeutics Inc. in a deal that could be valued at up to $1.7 billion.

In October 2025, Novartis acquired biopharmaceutical firm Avidity Biosciences in a deal valued at US$12 billion, adding to its muscular dystrophy portfolio.

=== Acquisition history ===
Novartis acquisitions
- Novartis AG
  - Novartis (Merger of Ciba-Geigy and Sandoz, 1996)
    - Ciba-Geigy
      - J. R. Geigy Ltd (Merged 1971)
      - CIBA (Merged 1971)
    - Sandoz
      - Kern and Sandoz Chemistry Firm (Founded 1886)
      - Wander AG (Acq 1967)
      - Lek d.d. (Slovenia) (Acq 2002)
      - Aspen Global inc (Japanese business) (Acq 2019)
  - Hexal (Acq 2005)
  - Eon Labs (Acq 2005)
  - Chiron Corporation (Acq 2006)
    - Matrix Pharmaceuticals Inc (Acq 2002)
    - PowderJect (Acq 2003)
    - PathoGenesis (Acq 2001)
    - Cetus Corporation
      - Cetus Oncology
      - Biocine Company
      - Chiron Diagnostics
      - Chiron Intraoptics
      - Chiron Technologies
    - Adatomed GmbH
  - Zhejiang Tianyuan Bio-Pharmaceutical Co., Ltd (Acq 2009)
  - Alcon (Founded 1945, Acq 2010)
    - Texas Pharmacal Company (Acq 1979)
  - Genoptix (Acq 2011)
  - Fougera Pharmaceuticals (Acq 2012)
  - CoStim Pharmaceuticals (Acq 2014)
  - GlaxoSmithKline (Cancer drug division) (Acq 2014)
  - Spinifex Pharmaceuticals (Acq 2015)
  - Admune Therapeutic (Acq 2015)
  - Selexys Pharmaceuticals (Acq 2016)
  - Ziarco Group Limited (Acq 2016)
  - Advanced Accelerator Applications (Acq 2018)
  - AveXis (Acq 2018)
  - Endocyte (Acq 2018)
  - CellforCure (Acq 2018)
  - The Medicines Company (Acq 2019)
  - Amblyotech (Acq 2020)
  - Vedere Bio (Acq 2020)
  - Cadent Therapeutics (Acq 2020)
    - Luc Therapeutics (Merged 2017)
    - Ataxion Therapeutics (Merged 2017)
  - Arctos Medical (Acq 2021)
  - Gyroscope Therapeutics (Acq 2021)
  - DTx Pharma, Inc. (Acq 2023)
  - Chinook Therapeutics, Inc. (Acq 2023)
  - MorphoSys (Acq 2024)
  - Mariana Oncology (Acq 2024)
  - Anthos Therapeutics (Acq 2025)
  - Regulus (Acq 2025)
  - Avidity Biosciences, Inc. (Acq 2025)

== Corporate structure ==
Shareholders of Novartis by country of origin as of 31 December 2022:
1. Switzerland (48.4%)
2. United Kingdom (23.7%)
3. United States (21.3%)
4. Other countries (6.64%)

Novartis AG is a publicly traded Swiss holding company that operates through the Novartis Group and owns, directly or indirectly, all companies worldwide that operate as subsidiaries of the Novartis Group. In the United States, they operate as Novartis Pharmaceuticals Corporation (NPC) headquartered in New Jersey.

Novartis's businesses are divided into two operating divisions: Innovative Medicines and Sandoz (generics). The eye-care division Alcon was spun off into an independent company in April 2019. In August 2022, Novartis announced plans to spin off Sandoz as part of restructuring. The spin-off was completed in October 2023.

The Innovative Medicines business is made up of two commercial units: Innovative Medicines International and Innovative Medicines US. The two business units combine the pharmaceutical and oncology divisions and commercially focus on global and US market respectively.

Novartis operates directly through subsidiaries, each of which fall under one of the divisions, and that Novartis categorizes as fulfilling one or more of the following functions: Holding/Finance, Sales, Production, and Research

Novartis AG also held 33.3 percent of the shares of Roche until 2022, however it did not exercise control over Roche. Novartis also has two significant license agreements with Genentech, a Roche subsidiary. One agreement is for Lucentis; the other is for Xolair.

In 2014, Novartis established a center in Hyderabad, India, in order to offshore several of its R&D, clinical development, medical writing and administrative functions. The center supports the drug major's operations in the pharmaceuticals (Novartis), eye care (Alcon), and generic drugs segments (Sandoz).

== Place in its market segments ==
Novartis is the world's largest in life sciences and agribusiness markets. It was also the second-largest pharmaceutical company by market cap in 2019.

- Alcon: At the time Novartis bought Alcon, it had annual sales of $6.5 billion and a net income of $2 billion. In April 2019, Novartis completed the spin-off of Alcon as a separate commercial entity.
- Sandoz: As of 2013, Sandoz has been recognized as the world's second-largest generic drug company. Sandoz' biosimilars lead its field, getting the first biosimilar approvals in the EU. In 2018, Sandoz reported US$9.9 billion in net sales. In August 2022, Novartis announced plans to spin off Sandoz by second half of 2023.
- Vaccines and Diagnostics Division: In 2013, Novartis announced it was considering selling the vaccines and diagnostics division off. This sale was completed in late 2015, and the division was integrated into CSL's BioCSL operation, with the combined entity trading as Seqirus. In 2018, Novartis sold its consumer healthcare joint venture vaccines division to GlaxoSmithKline for US$13.0 billion.
- Consumer: Novartis is not a leader in the over-the-counter or animal health segments; its leading OTC brands are Excedrin and Theraflu, but sales have been slowed by problems at its key US manufacturing plant.

In 2018, Novartis ranked second on the Access to Medicine Index, which "ranks companies on how readily they make their products available to the world's poor."

=== Finance ===
As of 31 January 2025, Novartis shares traded at over $104.72 per share, and its market capitalization was valued at $210.39B.

Year	Revenue in mil. US$	Net income in mil. US$	Price per Share in US$	Employees
2005	29,753	6,130	32.03	
2006	35,105	7,175	36.99	
2007	38,947	11,946	37.10	
2008	42,584	8,195	35.44	
2009	45,103	8,400	31.98	
2010	51,561	9,794	39.41	
2011	59,375	8,940	44.42	
2012	51,971	9,270	46.50	
2013	52,716	9,175	61.40	135,696
2014	53,634	10,210	76.50	133,413
2015	50,387	17,783	86.92	122,966
2016	49,436	6,712	71.10	122,985
2017	50,135	7,703	77.33	126,457
2018	46,099	12,614	91.13	129,924
2019	48,677	11,732	88.14	103,914
2020	49,898	8,072	84.38	110,000
2021	51,626	24,018	87.47	110,000
2022	50,545	6,955	80.56	101,703
2023	45,440	14,854	100.34	76,057
2024	50,317	11,939	104.72	75,883

=== Pricing ===
==== Entresto (sacubitril/valsartan) ====
In 2023, the Institute for Clinical and Economic Review (ICER) identified Entresto as one of five high-expenditure drugs that experienced significant net price increases without new clinical evidence to justify the hikes. Specifically, Entresto's wholesale acquisition cost rose by 7%, leading to an additional $72 million in costs to U.S. payers.

== Research ==
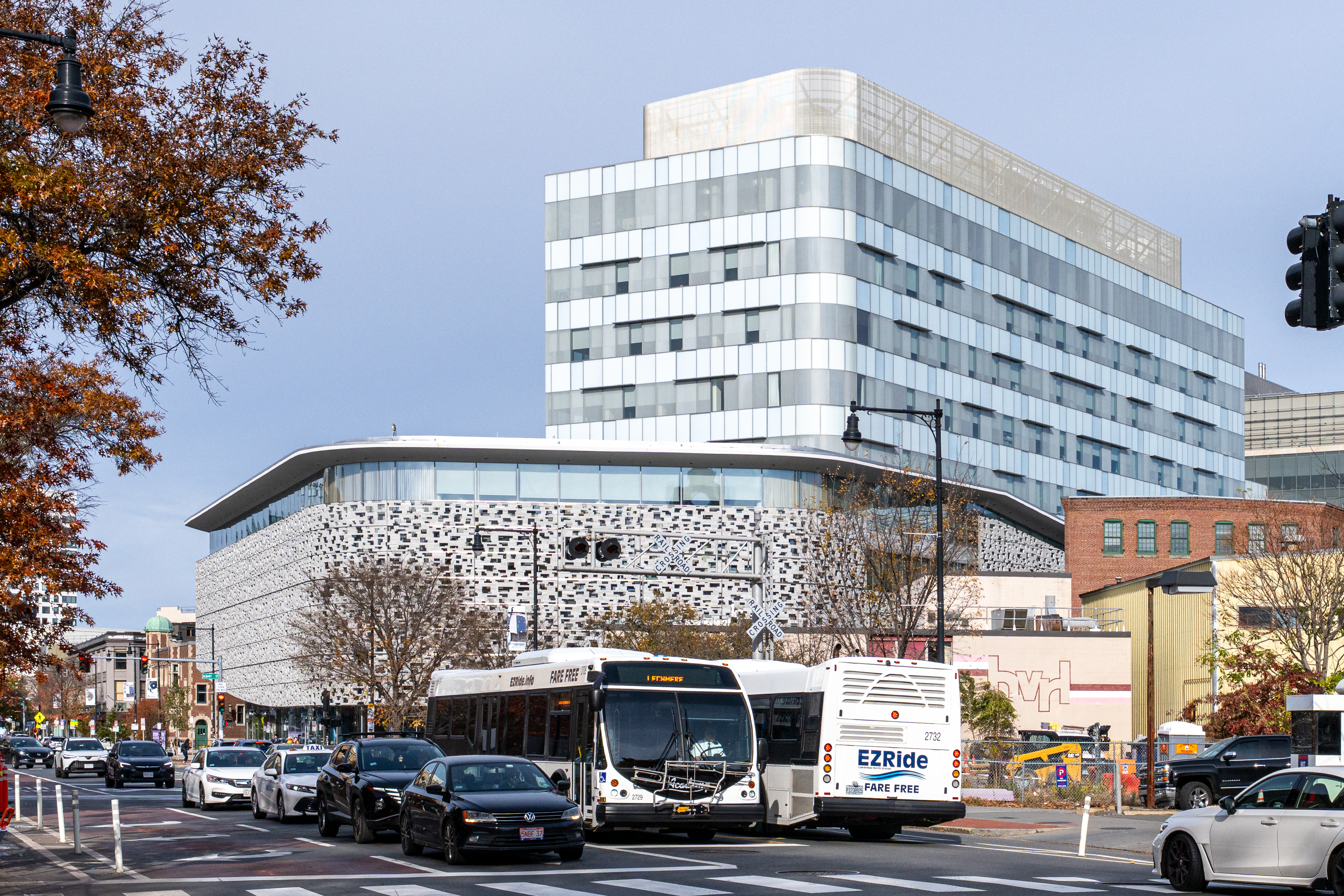
Novartis Global Research Headquarters in Cambridge, Massachusetts (2025)

The company's global research operations, called "Novartis Institutes for BioMedical Research (NIBR)" have their global headquarters in Cambridge, Massachusetts, United States. Two research institutes reside within NIBR that focus on diseases in the developing world: Novartis Institute for Tropical Diseases, which works on tuberculosis, dengue, and malaria, and Novartis Vaccines Institute for Global Health, which works on salmonella typhi (typhoid fever) and shigella.

Novartis is also involved in publicly funded collaborative research projects, with other industrial and academic partners. One example in the area of non-clinical safety assessment is the InnoMed PredTox project. The company is expanding its activities in joint research projects within the framework of the Innovative Medicines Initiative of EFPIA and the European Commission.

Novartis is working with Science 37 in order to allow video based telemedicine visits instead of physical traveling to clinics for patients. It is planning for ten clinical trials over three years using mobile technology to help free patients from burdensome hospital trips.

== Products ==
=== Pharmaceuticals (66 in total as of 28 April 2023) ===
Name	Indication(s) or drug type/class	Sales US$1,000,000	Sales year	% Change	Notes
Aclasta/Reclast (zoledronic acid)	Osteoporosis	590	2012	−4%	
Adelphane-Esidrex (reserpine/dihydralazine/hydrochlorothiazide)	Hypertension				
Afinitor/Certican/Zortress (everolimus)	Prevention of transplant rejection, various cancers	797	2012	80%	
Amturnide (aliskiren/amlodipine/hydrochlorothiazide)	Hypertension				
Anafranil (clomipramine)	Major depressive disorder, obsessive-compulsive disorder				
Arcapta Neohaler/Onbrez Breezhaler (indacaterol)	COPD				
Brinaldix (clopamide)	Hypertension				
Clozaril/Leponex (clozapine)	Treatment-resistant schizophrenia				
Co-Diovan (Valsartan/hydrochlorothiazide)	Hypertension				
Coartem/Riamet (artemether/lumefantrine)	Malaria (uncomplicated)				
Comtan (entacapone)	Parkinson's disease	530	2012	−14%	
Cosentyx (secukinumab)	Psoriasis				
Diovan (valsartan)	Hypertension	4,417	2012	−22%	
Entresto (sacubitril/valsartan)	Heart failure				One of five high-expenditure drugs that experienced significant net price increases without new clinical evidence to justify the hikes.
Enterovioform (clioquinol)	Amoebiasis				
Eucreas/Galvus Met (vildagliptin/metformin)	Diabetes mellitus type 2				
Exelon Patch (rivastigmine)	Alzheimer's disease	1,050	2012	−2%	
Exforge (amlodipine/valsartan)	Hypertension	1,352	2012	12%	
Exjade (deferasirox)	Chronic iron overload	870	2012	2%	Manufactured as tablets for oral suspension; tablets for oral use are marketed under the brand name Jadenu
Famvir (famciclovir)	Herpes zoster and other Herpesvirus infection				
Fanapt (iloperidone)	Schizophrenia				
Femara (letrozole)	Breast cancer	438	2012	−52%	
Focalin (dexmethylphenidate)	ADHD				The first US generics of Focalin became available in 2007. Focalin XR was approved in 2005, with generics being approved in 2012.
Foradil/Foradile (formoterol)	Asthma, COPD				
Galvus (vildagliptin)	Diabetes mellitus type 2	910	2012	39%	
Gilenya (fingolimod)	Multiple sclerosis	1,195	2012	142%	
Gleevec/Glivec (imatinib)	Oncology, Chronic myelogenous leukemia	4,675	2012	0%	
Hygroton (chlortalidone)	Hypertension				
Ilaris (canakinumab)	Cryopyrin-associated periodic syndrome				
Jadenu (deferasirox)	Chronic iron overload				Deferasirox tablets for oral use—a new formulation of Exjade (which comes in tablets for oral suspension)
Jakavi/Jakafi (ruxolitinib)	Myelofibrosis (of intermediate to high risk)				
Kisqali (ribociclib)	Breast Cancer	1,231	2022		
Kymriah (tisagenlecleucel)	Acute lymphoblastic leukemia				
Lamisil (terbinafine)	Fungal infections				
Lescol (fluvastatin)	Hypercholesterolemia	665	2007	−8%	
Lioresal (baclofen)	Spasticity				
Lotrel (amlodipine/benazepril)	Hypertension	748	2007	−34%	
Lucentis (ranibizumab)	Age-related macular degeneration	2,398	2012	17%	
Ludiomil (maprotiline)	Major depressive disorder				
Mayzent (siponimod)	Treatment for secondary progressive multiple sclerosis (SPMS)				FDA approved 26 March 2019
Mellaril (thioridazine)	Schizophrenia				
Myfortic (mycophenolic acid)	Prevention of transplant rejection	579	2012	12%	
Navoban (tropisetron)	Chemotherapy-induced nausea and vomiting				
Odomzo (sonidegib)	Locally advanced basal cell carcinoma				
Ritalin (methylphenidate)	ADHD	554	2012	1%	
Sandimmune/Neoral (ciclosporin)	Prevention of transplant rejection	821	2012	−9%	
Sandostatin (octreotide)	Acromegaly	1,512	2012	5%	
Scemblix (Asciminib)	Philadelphia chromosome-positive chronic myeloid leukemia				
Sertraline Sandoz (sertraline hydrochloride)	Depression, obsessive-compulsive disorder, panic disorder				Generic form of sertraline.
Signifor (pasireotide)	Cushing's disease				
Simulect (basiliximab)	Prevention of transplant rejection				
Sirdalud (tizanidine)	Spasticity				
Spersallerg (antazoline/tetrahydrozoline)	Allergic conjunctivitis				
Stalevo (carbidopa/levodopa/entacapone)	Parkinson's disease				
Tasigna (nilotinib)	Chronic myelogenous leukemia (first-line treatment)	998	2012	39%	NICE formulary approval, January 2012
Tegretol (carbamazepine)	Epilepsy, bipolar disorder	413	2007	6%	
Tekamlo (aliskiren/amlodipine)	Hypertension				
Tekturna/Rasilez (aliskiren)	Hypertension				
Termalgin (paracetamol)	Fever, mild pain				
Tobi (tobramycin)	Prevention of Pseudomonas aeruginosa infection in cystic fibrosis	350 (US only)	2012		Teva introduced generic in the US in 2013
Tofranil (imipramine)	Major depressive disorder, enuresis				
Trileptal (oxcarbazepine)	Epilepsy, bipolar disorder	690 (US only)	2007		Teva introduced generic in 2008
Tyzeca/Sebivo (telbivudine)	Chronic hepatitis B				
Visudyne (verteporfin)	Age-related macular degeneration (wet form)				
Voltaren (diclofenac)	Acute pain, inflammatory disorders (such as rheumatoid arthritis)	759 (excl. OTC)	2012	−4%	
Zometa (zoledronic acid)	Prevention of bone fractures in cancer patients	1,288	2012	−13%	
Xolair (omalizumab)	Moderate-to-severe asthma not controlled by inhaled steroids Chronic idiopathic urticaria	504	2012	4%	
Zaditen (ketotifen)	Asthma, allergic conjunctivitis				

=== Consumer health ===
- Benefiber
- Bialcol Alcohol
- Buckley's cold and cough formula
- Bufferin
- ChestEze
- Comtrex cold and cough
- Denavir/Vectavir
- Desenex
- Doan's pain relief
- Ex-Lax
- Excedrin
- Fenistil
- Gas-X
- Habitrol
- Keri skin care
- Lamisil foot care
- Lipactin herpes symptomatic treatment
- Maalox
- Nicotinell
- No-doz
- Quinvaxem (Pentavalent vaccine)
- Otrivine
- Prevacid 24HR
- Savlon
- Tavist
- Theraflu
- Vagistat
- Tixylix
- Voltaren

In January 2009, the United States Department of Health and Human Services awarded Novartis a $486 million contract for construction of the first US plant to produce cell-based influenza vaccine, to be located in Holly Springs, North Carolina. The stated goal of this program is the capability of producing 150,000,000 doses of pandemic vaccine within six months of declaring a flu pandemic.

In April 2014, Novartis divested its consumer health section with $3.5 billion worth of assets into a new joint venture with GlaxoSmithKline, named GSK Consumer Healthcare, of which Novartis will hold a 36.5% stake. In March 2018, GSK announced that it has reached an agreement with Novartis to acquire Novartis' 36.5% stake in their Consumer Healthcare Joint Venture for $13 billion (£9.2 billion).

=== Animal health ===
==== Pet care ====
- Interceptor (Milbemycin oxime), oral worm control product
- Sentinel Flavor Tabs (Milbemycin oxime, Lufenuron), oral flea control product
- Deramaxx (Deracoxib), oral treatment for pain and inflammation from osteoarthritis in dogs
- Capstar (Nitenpyram), oral tablet for flea control
- Milbemax (Milbemycin oxime, Praziquantel), oral worm treatment
- Program (Lufenuron), oral tablet for flea control

==== Livestock ====
- Acatalk Duostar (Fluazuron, Ivermectin), tick control for cattle
- CLiK (Dicyclanil), blowfly control for sheep
- Denagard (Tiamulin), antibiotic for the treatment of swine dysentery associated with Brachyspira (formerly Serpulina or Treponema)
- Fasinex (Triclabendazole), oral drench for cattle that is used for the treatment and control of all three stages of liver fluke
- ViraShield, For use in healthy cattle, including pregnant cows and heifers, as an aid in the prevention of disease caused by infectious bovine rhinotracheitis (IBR), bovine virus diarrhoea (BVD Type 1 and BVD Type 2), parainfluenza Type 3 (PI3), and bovine respiratory syncytial (BRSV) viruses

==== Bioprotection (insect and rodent control) ====
- Actara (Thiamethoxam)
- Atrazine (Atrazine)
- Larvadex (Cyromazine)
- Neporex (Cyromazine)
- Oxyfly (Lambda-cyhalothrin)
- Virusnip (Potassium monopersulfate)

== Controversies and criticism ==
=== Challenge to India's patent laws ===
Novartis fought a seven-year, controversial battle to patent Gleevec in India, and took the case all the way to the Indian Supreme Court, where the patent application was finally rejected. The patent application at the center of the case was filed by Novartis in India in 1998, after India had agreed to enter the World Trade Organization and to abide by worldwide intellectual property standards under the TRIPS agreement. As part of this agreement, India made changes to its patent law; the biggest of which was that prior to these changes, patents on products were not allowed, afterwards they were, albeit with restrictions. These changes came into effect in 2005, so Novartis' patent application waited in a "mailbox" with others until then, under procedures that India instituted to manage the transition. India also passed certain amendments to its patent law in 2005, just before the laws came into effect, which played a key role in the rejection of the patent application.

The patent application claimed the final form of Gleevec (the beta crystalline form of imatinib mesylate). In 1993 before India allowed patents on products, Novartis had patented imatinib, with salts vaguely specified, in many countries but could not patent it in India. The key differences between the two patent applications were that the 1998 patent application specified the counterion (Gleevec is a specific salt—imatinib mesylate) while the 1993 patent application did not claim any specific salts nor did it mention mesylate, and the 1998 patent application specified the solid form of Gleevec—the way the individual molecules are packed together into a solid when the drug itself is manufactured (this is separate from processes by which the drug itself is formulated into pills or capsules)—while the 1993 patent application did not. The solid form of imatinib mesylate in Gleevec is beta crystalline.

As provided under the TRIPS agreement, Novartis applied for Exclusive Marketing Rights (EMR) for Gleevec from the Indian Patent Office and the EMR was granted in November 2003. Novartis made use of the EMR to obtain orders against some generic manufacturers who had already launched Gleevec in India. Novartis set the price of Gleevec at US$2666 per patient per month; generic companies were selling their versions at US$177 to 266 per patient per month. Novartis also initiated a program to assist patients who could not afford its version of the drug, concurrent with its product launch.

When examination of Novartis' patent application began in 2005, it came under immediate attack from oppositions initiated by generic companies that were already selling Gleevec in India and by advocacy groups. The application was rejected by the patent office and by an appeal board. The key basis for the rejection was the part of Indian patent law that was created by amendment in 2005, describing the patentability of new uses for known drugs and modifications of known drugs. That section, Paragraph 3d, specified that such inventions are patentable only if "they differ significantly in properties with regard to efficacy." At one point, Novartis went to court to try to invalidate Paragraph 3d; it argued that the provision was unconstitutionally vague and that it violated TRIPS. Novartis lost that case and did not appeal. Novartis did appeal the rejection by the patent office to India's Supreme Court, which took the case.

The Supreme Court case hinged on the interpretation of Paragraph 3d. The Supreme Court decided that the substance that Novartis sought to patent was indeed a modification of a known drug (the raw form of imatinib, which was publicly disclosed in the 1993 patent application and in scientific articles), that Novartis did not present evidence of a difference in therapeutic efficacy between the final form of Gleevec and the raw form of imatinib, and that therefore the patent application was properly rejected by the patent office and lower courts.

Although the court ruled narrowly, and took care to note that the subject application was filed during a time of transition in Indian patent law, the decision generated widespread global news coverage and reignited debates on balancing public good with monopolistic pricing, innovation with affordability etc.

Had Novartis won and had its patent issued, it could not have prevented generics companies in India from selling generic Gleevec, but it could have obliged them to pay a reasonable royalty under a grandfather clause included in India's patent law.

In reaction to the decision, Ranjit Shahani, vice-chairman and managing director of Novartis India Ltd was quoted as saying "This ruling is a setback for patients that will hinder medical progress for diseases without effective treatment options." He also said that companies like Novartis would invest less money in research in India as a result of the ruling. Novartis also emphasised that it continues to be committed to good access to its drugs; according to Novartis, by 2013, "95% of patients in India—roughly 16,000 people—receive Glivec free of charge... and it has provided more than $1.7 billion worth of Glivec to Indian patients in its support program since it was started...."

=== Sexual discrimination ===
On 17 May 2010, a jury in the United States District Court for the Southern District of New York awarded $3,367,250 in compensatory damages against Novartis, finding that the company had committed sexual discrimination against twelve female sales representatives and entry-level managers since 2002, in matters of pay, promotion, and treatment after learning that the employees were pregnant. Two months later the company settled with the remaining plaintiffs for $152.5 million plus attorney fees.

=== Marketing violations ===
In September 2008, the US Food and Drug Administration (FDA) sent a notice to Novartis Pharmaceuticals regarding its advertising of Focalin XR, an ADHD drug, in which the company overstated its efficacy while marketing to the public and medical professionals.

In 2005, federal prosecutors opened an investigation into Novartis' marketing of several drugs: Trileptal, an antiseizure drug; three drugs for heart conditions—Diovan (the company's top-selling product), Exforge, and Tekturna; Sandostatin, a drug to treat a growth hormone disorder; and Zelnorm, a drug for irritable bowel syndrome. In September 2010, Novartis agreed to pay US$422.5 million in criminal and civil claims and to enter into a corporate integrity agreement with the US Office of the Inspector General. According to The New York Times, "Federal prosecutors accused Novartis of paying illegal kickbacks to health care professionals through speaker programs, advisory boards, entertainment, travel and meals. But aside from pleading guilty to one misdemeanor charge of mislabeling in an agreement that Novartis announced in February, the company denied wrongdoing." In the same New York Times article, Frank Lichtenberg, a Columbia professor who receives pharmaceutical financing for research on innovation in the industry, said off-label prescribing was encouraged by the American Medical Association and paid for by insurers, but off-label marketing was clearly illegal. "So it's not surprising that they would settle because they don't have a legal leg to stand on."

In April 2013, federal prosecutors filed two lawsuits against Novartis under the False Claims Act for off-label marketing and kickbacks; in both suits, prosecutors are seeking treble damages. The first suit "accused Novartis of inducing pharmacies to switch thousands of kidney transplant patients to its immunosuppressant drug Myfortic in exchange for kickbacks disguised as rebates and discounts". In the second, the Justice Department joined a qui tam, or whistleblower, lawsuit brought by a former sales rep over off-label marketing of three drugs: Lotrel and Valturna (both hypertension drugs), and the diabetes drug, Starlix. Twenty-seven states, the District of Columbia and Chicago and New York also joined.

=== Avastin ===
Outside the US, Novartis markets the drug ranibizumab (trade name Lucentis), which is a monoclonal antibody fragment derived from the same parent mouse antibody as bevacizumab (Avastin). Both Avastin and Lucentis were created by Genentech which is owned by Roche; Roche markets Avastin worldwide, and also markets Lucentis in the US. Lucentis has been approved worldwide as a treatment for wet macular degeneration and other retinal disorders; Avastin is used to treat certain cancers. Because the price of Lucentis is much higher than Avastin, many ophthalmologists began having compounding pharmacies formulate Avastin for administration to the eye and began treating their patients with Avastin. In 2011, four trusts of the National Health Service in the UK issued policies approving use and payment for administering Avastin for macular degeneration, in order to save money, even though Avastin had not been approved for that indication. In April 2012, after failing to persuade the trusts that it was uncertain whether Avastin was as safe and effective as Lucentis, and in order to retain the market for Lucentis, Novartis announced it would sue the trusts. However, in July Novartis offered significant discounts (kept confidential) to the trusts, and the trusts agreed to change their policy, and in November, Novartis dropped the litigation.

=== Valsartan ===
In the summer of 2013, two Japanese universities retracted several publications of clinical trials that purported to show that Valsartan (branded as Diovan) had cardiovascular benefits, when it was found that statistical analysis had been manipulated, and that a Novartis employee had participated in the statistical analysis but had not disclosed his relationship with Novartis but only his affiliation with Osaka City University, where he was a lecturer. As a result, several Japanese hospitals stopped using the drug, and media outlets ran reports on the scandal in Japan. In January 2014 Japan's Health Ministry filed a criminal complaint with the Tokyo public prosecutor's office against Novartis and an unspecified number of employees, for allegedly misleading consumers through advertisements that used the research to support the benefits of Diovan. On 1 July 2014 the prosecutor's office announced it was formally charging the company and one of its employees.

=== Corruption ===
In January 2018, Novartis began being investigated by US and Greek authorities for allegedly bribing Greek public officials in the 2006–2015 period, in a scheme which included two former prime ministers, several former health ministers, many high ranking party members of the Nea Dimokratia and PASOK ruling parties, as well as bankers. The manager of Novartis' Greek branch was prohibited from leaving the country. The minister's deputy described the allegations as "the biggest scandal since the creation of the Greek state", which caused "annual state expenditure on medicine to explode". Most of the ministers involved in the scandal have denied the allegations and sought to paint the case as "political targeting" and "fabrication" by the Syriza opposition party. However, the Greek Judicial Council ruled that the scandal was real. Besides bribery that involves artificial increases in the price of several medicines, the case also involves money laundering, with suspicions of "illegal funds of more than four billion euros ($4.2 billion)" were involved.

In June 2020, Novartis reached settlements with the US Department of Justice (DOJ) and the US Securities and Exchange Commission (SEC) resolving all Foreign Corrupt Practices Act (FCPA) investigations into historical conduct by the company and its subsidiaries. As part of the resolutions, Novartis and some of its current and former subsidiaries would pay US$233.9 million to the DOJ and US$112.8 million to the SEC.

=== Michael Cohen ===
Senate Finance Committee report on Michael Cohen's dealings with Novartis, entitled "White House Access for Sale"

Novartis paid $1.2 million to Essential Consultants, an entity owned by Michael Cohen, following the 2017 inauguration of Donald Trump. Cohen was paid monthly, with each payment just under $100,000. Novartis claims it paid Cohen to help it understand and influence the new administration's approach to drug pricing and regulation.

In July 2018, the US Senate committee report "White House Access for Sale" revealed that Novartis Ag's relationship with Cohen was "longer and more detailed". Novartis initially stated that the relationship ceased a month after entering the US$1.2 million contract with Cohen's consulting firm since the consultants were not able to provide the information the pharmaceutical company needed. Later, it became clear, however, that then-CEO Joseph Jimenez and Cohen communicated via email multiple times during 2017, which included ideas to lower drug prices to be discussed with the president. According to the report, several of the ideas appeared later in Trump's drug pricing plan, released in early 2018, in which pharmaceutical companies were protected from reduced revenues.

=== AveXis data integrity ===
Having already received approval for Zolgensma in May 2019, on 28 June AveXis (a Novartis company) voluntarily disclosed to the FDA that some data previously submitted to the agency as part of the Biologics License Application (BLA) package was inaccurate. Specifically, the data manipulation related to an in vivo murine potency assay used in the early development of the product but the issue the FDA and wider community has taken is that AveXis was aware of the data manipulation as early as 14 March 2019, almost two months before the BLA was approved. To compound the problem in early August it emerged a senior manager sold almost $1 million worth of stock immediately before the FDA probe became public on 6 August, but after the company had informed the FDA of the problem. As of September 2019, the FDA was still preparing its response to the scandal.

=== False Claims Act Violations ===
In July 2020, Novartis Pharmaceuticals Corporation agreed to pay $642 million to settle allegations under the False Claims Act involving improper payments to patients and physicians. Of the total, $591 million resolved claims that Novartis organized sham "speaker programs" and other inducements to pay kickbacks to doctors for prescribing its drugs. An additional $51.25 million resolved allegations that Novartis funneled money through ostensibly independent charitable foundations to cover Medicare copays for patients taking Gilenya (multiple sclerosis) and Afinitor (renal cell carcinoma and certain tumors). Prosecutors argued that these practices violated the Anti-Kickback Statute and undermined federal health programs by encouraging the use of Novartis's higher-priced products. The settlement was among the largest of its kind against a pharmaceutical manufacturer at the time.

== Philanthropy ==
=== Fight against leprosy ===
Novartis has been committed for decades to eliminate leprosy by providing free, multidrug therapy to all endemic countries since 2000.
