= Benazepril =

Medication used to treat high blood pressure and heart failure

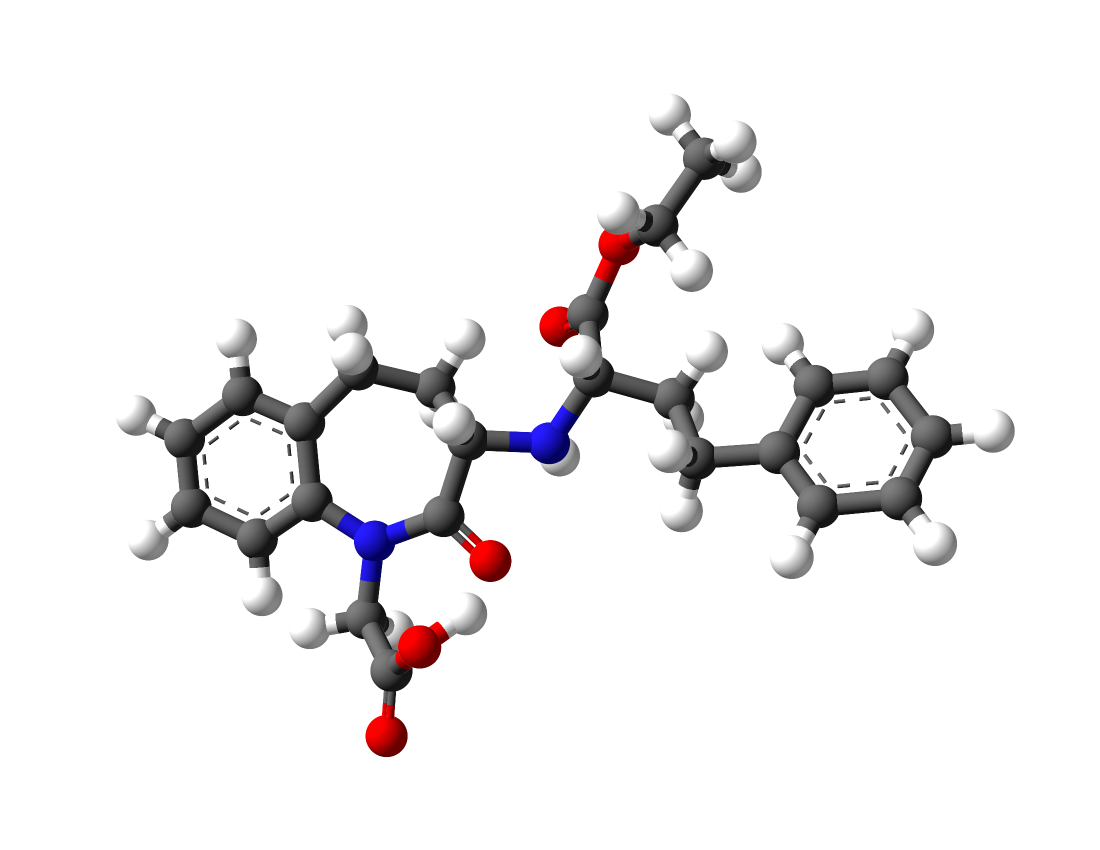

Clinical data
- Pronunciation: /bəˈnæzəprɪl/
- Trade names: Lotensin, others
- AHFS/Drugs.com: Monograph
- MedlinePlus: a692011
- License data: US DailyMed: Benazepril
- Routes of administration: By mouth
- ATC code: C09AA07 (WHO)

Legal status
- Legal status: US: ℞-only; In general: ℞ (Prescription only)

Pharmacokinetic data
- Protein binding: 96.7%
- Metabolism: Liver glucuronidation
- Elimination half-life: 10-11 hours
- Excretion: Kidney and bile duct

Identifiers
- IUPAC name: 2-[(3S)-3-[[(2S)-1-ethoxy-1-oxo-4-phenylbutan-2-yl]amino]-2-oxo-4,5-dihydro-3H-1-benzazepin-1-yl]acetic acid
- CAS Number: 86541-75-5
- PubChem CID: 5362124
- IUPHAR/BPS: 6374
- DrugBank: DB00542
- ChemSpider: 4514935
- UNII: UDM7Q7QWP8
- KEGG: D07499; D00620
- ChEBI: CHEBI:3011
- ChEMBL: ChEMBL838
- CompTox Dashboard (EPA): DTXSID5022645

Chemical and physical data
- Formula: C_{24}H_{28}N_{2}O_{5}
- Molar mass: 424.497 g·mol^{−1}
- 3D model (JSmol): Interactive image
- SMILES: O=C(OCC)[C@@H](N[C@@H]2C(=O)N(c1ccccc1CC2)CC(=O)O)CCc3ccccc3
- InChI: InChI=1S/C24H28N2O5/c1-2-31-24(30)20(14-12-17-8-4-3-5-9-17)25-19-15-13-18-10-6-7-11-21(18)26(23(19)29)16-22(27)28/h3-11,19-20,25H,2,12-16H2,1H3,(H,27,28)/t19-,20-/m0/s1; Key:XPCFTKFZXHTYIP-PMACEKPBSA-N

Benazepril, sold under the brand name Lotensin among others, is a medication used to treat high blood pressure, heart failure, and diabetic kidney disease. It is a reasonable initial treatment for high blood pressure. It is taken by mouth. Versions are available as the combinations benazepril/hydrochlorothiazide and benazepril/amlodipine.

Common side effects include feeling tired, dizziness, cough, and light-headedness with standing. Serious side effects may include kidney problems, low blood pressure, high blood potassium, and angioedema. Use in pregnancy may harm the baby, while use when breastfeeding may be safe. It is an ACE inhibitor and works by decreasing renin-angiotensin-aldosterone system activity.

Benazepril was patented in 1981 and came into medical use in 1990. It is available as a generic medication. In 2023, it was the 172nd most commonly prescribed medication in the United States, with more than 2 million prescriptions.

== Medical uses ==
Lotensin is indicated for the treatment of hypertension, to lower blood pressure.

== Side effects ==
The most common side effects patients experience are a headache or a chronic cough. The chronic cough develops in about 20% of people treated.

== Contraindications ==
Benazepril can harm the fetus.

== Dosage forms ==
It is also available in combination with hydrochlorothiazide, under the brand name Lotensin HCT, and with amlodipine (Lotrel).

== Veterinary uses ==
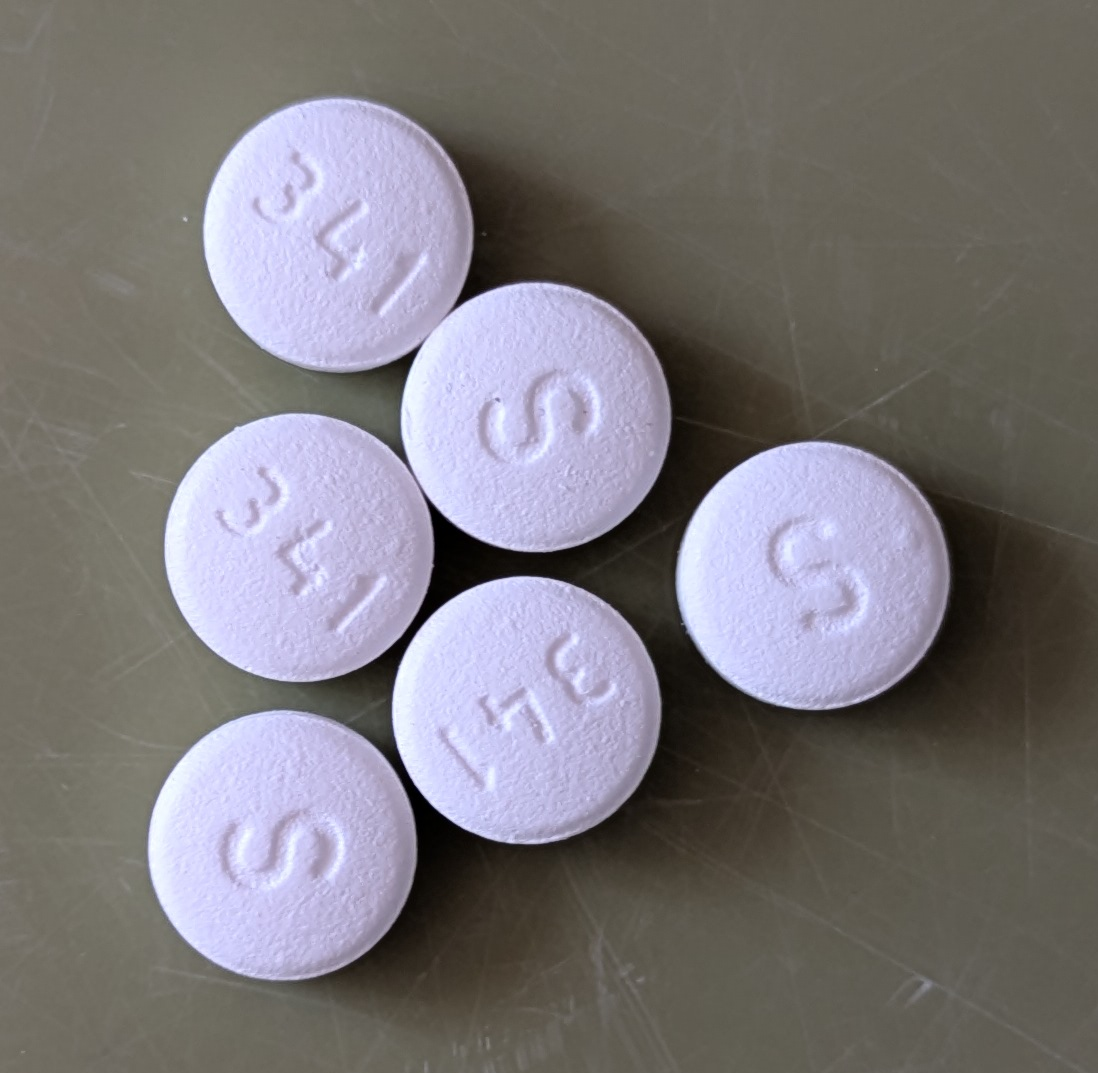
Benazepril for veterinary use

Under the brand names Fortekor (Novartis) and VetACE (Jurox Animal Health), benazepril is used to treat congestive heart failure in dogs and chronic kidney failure in cats and dogs.
