= Daniel Vasella =

Swiss businessperson and corporate director

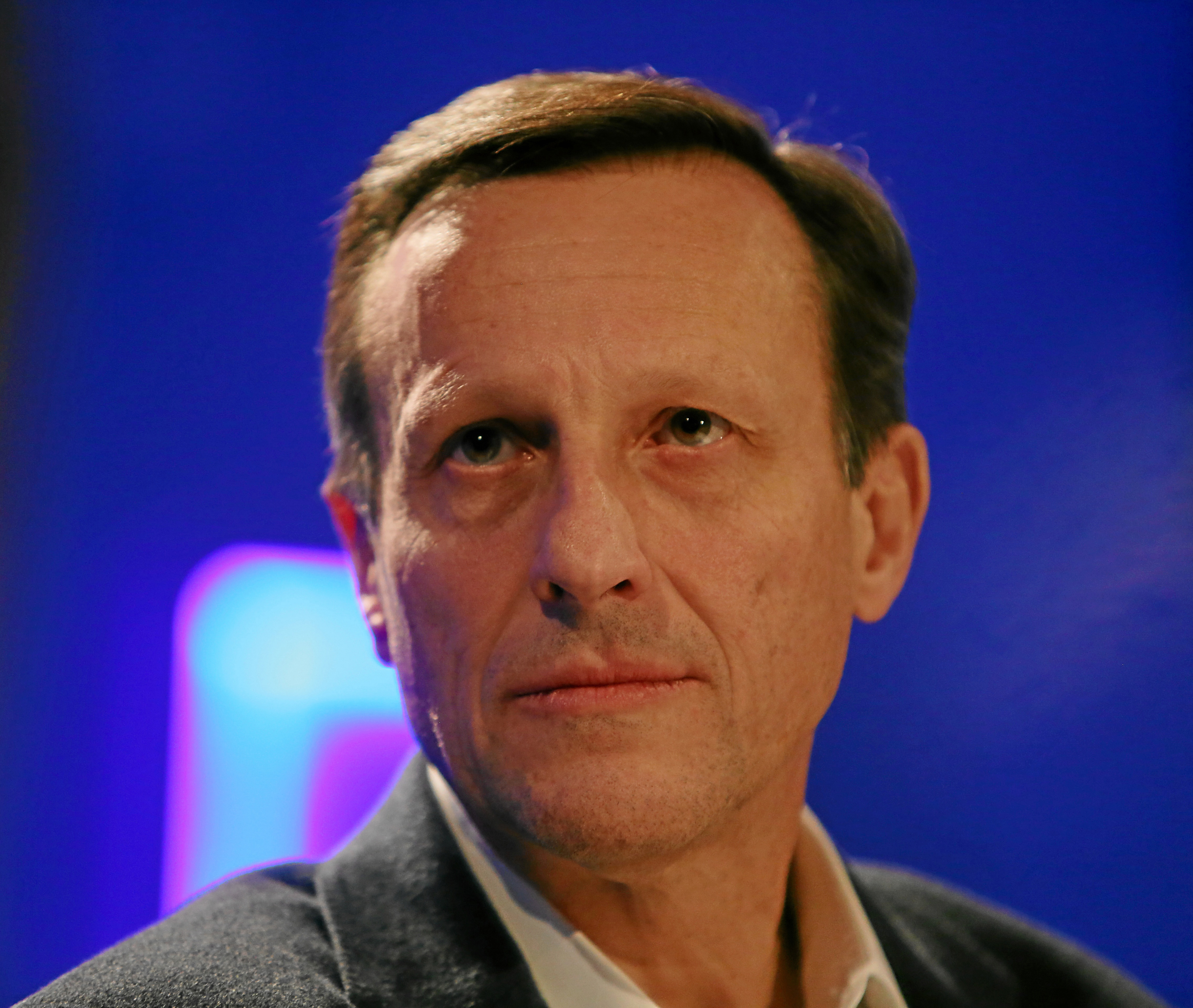
- Vasella in 2013
- Born: 15 August 1953 (age 73); Fribourg, Switzerland
- Education: University of Bern (MD)
- Occupation: Businessman
- Spouse: Anne-Laurence
- Children: 3

Daniel Lucius Vasella (born 15 August 1953) is a Swiss medical doctor, author, and executive who was CEO and chairman of the Swiss pharmaceutical company Novartis AG, the world's fifth largest drug company. During his tenure Novartis shares fell 10%, compared to the industry average. In February 2013 Vasella was awarded close to $78 million in a "golden handshake"

In November 2014, Vasella was elected as a member of the board of directors at XBiotech, Inc, a biopharmaceutical company located in Austin, Texas, that focuses on the discovery and commercialization of a next generation of therapeutic antibodies which harness a human's natural immunity to fight disease. Vasella is an honorary member of the American Academy of Arts and Sciences. In 2004, Time magazine named him one of the world's 100 most influential people, and he was chosen as the Most Influential European Business Leader of the Last 25 Years by the readers of the Financial Times. He is a former member of the steering committee of the Bilderberg Group.

== Early life and education ==
Vasella was born in Fribourg, Switzerland, in 1953. His father was a history professor at the local university, and his mother was a housewife. His desire to become a doctor began during his childhood, which was marked by several tragedies. At eight years old, he contracted TB and meningitis and spent nearly a year in hospitals. When Vasella was 13 years old, his father died from complications of surgery.

Vasella obtained his M.D. in 1980 from the University of Bern in Switzerland. He completed his residency at the University Hospital in Bern and the city hospital in Zurich, before returning to Bern as chief resident. In 1988, he changed career paths, working in the United States as a pharmaceutical sales representative and in market research. In 1989, he completed the Program for Management Development at Harvard Business School. Vasella was awarded an honorary doctorate for medicine by the University of Basel in 2002.

== Career ==
Vasella held a number of medical positions in Switzerland before being hired in 1988 by Sandoz Pharmaceutical Corporation, the former U.S. subsidiary of Swiss pharmaceutical company, Sandoz. He remained there until 1992, when he was promoted to CEO of parent company, Sandoz Pharma Ltd., and named a member of the group executive committee.

Vasella helped to orchestrate the 1996 merger between Sandoz and Ciba-Geigy, another Swiss pharmaceutical company. The two companies combined to form Novartis AG. Vasella was appointed CEO of the combined entity and a member of the board of directors. In 1999, he was named chairman of the board of directors.

In January 2010, Vasella decided to step down as CEO. He was replaced by his hand-picked successor, Joseph Jimenez, the Division Head of Novartis Pharmaceuticals at the time.

In January 2013, Novartis announced that Vasella would be retiring as chairman of the board of directors in February 2013. Vasella was named an honorary chairman, to be succeeded by Jörg Reinhard in August 2013. According to the Ethos foundation Vasella earned from 2002 until 2012 312 Mio CHF from Novartis, and for the years before they estimated it to 60 Mio CHF, a total of 421 Mio CHF in 2013. That he should get 72 Mio CHF for a noncompetition clause at the end made him a public figure during the campaign for the Swiss referendum "against rip-off salaries".

== Other activities ==
- Numab Therapeutics, Member of the Board of Directors (since 2019)
- Bill & Melinda Gates Foundation, Member of the Global Health Program Advisory Panel (since 2008)

== Writing ==
Vasella authored Magic Cancer Bullet: How a Tiny Orange Pill May Rewrite Medical History (2003), a book about the discovery and development of the breakthrough cancer drug Gleevec. The book was co-written with Robert Slater.

== Personal life ==
Vasella met Anne-Laurence Moret, the niece of former Sandoz CFO, CEO, and chairman Marc Moret, in 1973, and they were married in 1978. Vasella and his wife have two sons and a daughter. His older brother, Andrea Vasella, was a professor at the ETH Zurich. Vasella is a patron of the arts and enjoys skiing and spending time outdoors.

== Awards and recognition ==
Vasella has received numerous awards including:

- 2003: Harvard Alumnus Award
- 2004: Most Influential European Business Leader of the Last 25 Years by the readers of Financial Times
- 2004: Time magazine: One of the Top 100 Most Influential Personalities
- 2004: The Cancer Research Institute's Oliver R. Grace Award (for Distinguished Service in Advancing Cancer Research)
- University of Marburg’s Karl Winnacker Preis 2007
- Elected to the American Academy of Arts and Sciences, 2008
- GILD Award for Leadership: Warren Bennis Award for Excellence in Leadership, 2010
