= Nebivolol/valsartan =

Combination drug

Combination of
- Nebivolol: Beta blocker
- Valsartan: Angiotensin II receptor blocker (ARB)

Clinical data
- Trade names: Byvalson, Vyduo
- AHFS/Drugs.com: Micromedex Detailed Consumer Information
- License data: US DailyMed: Nebivolol hydrochloride and valsartan
- Routes of administration: By mouth
- ATC code: C09DX05 (WHO)

Legal status
- Legal status: US: ℞-only

Identifiers
- CAS Number: 1268819-57-3
- PubChem CID: 73050811
- KEGG: D11388

Nebivolol/valsartan, sold under the brand name Byvalson among others, is a medication used to treat hypertension.

It is available as a generic medication.
