= Vasant Narasimhan =

American doctor and CEO

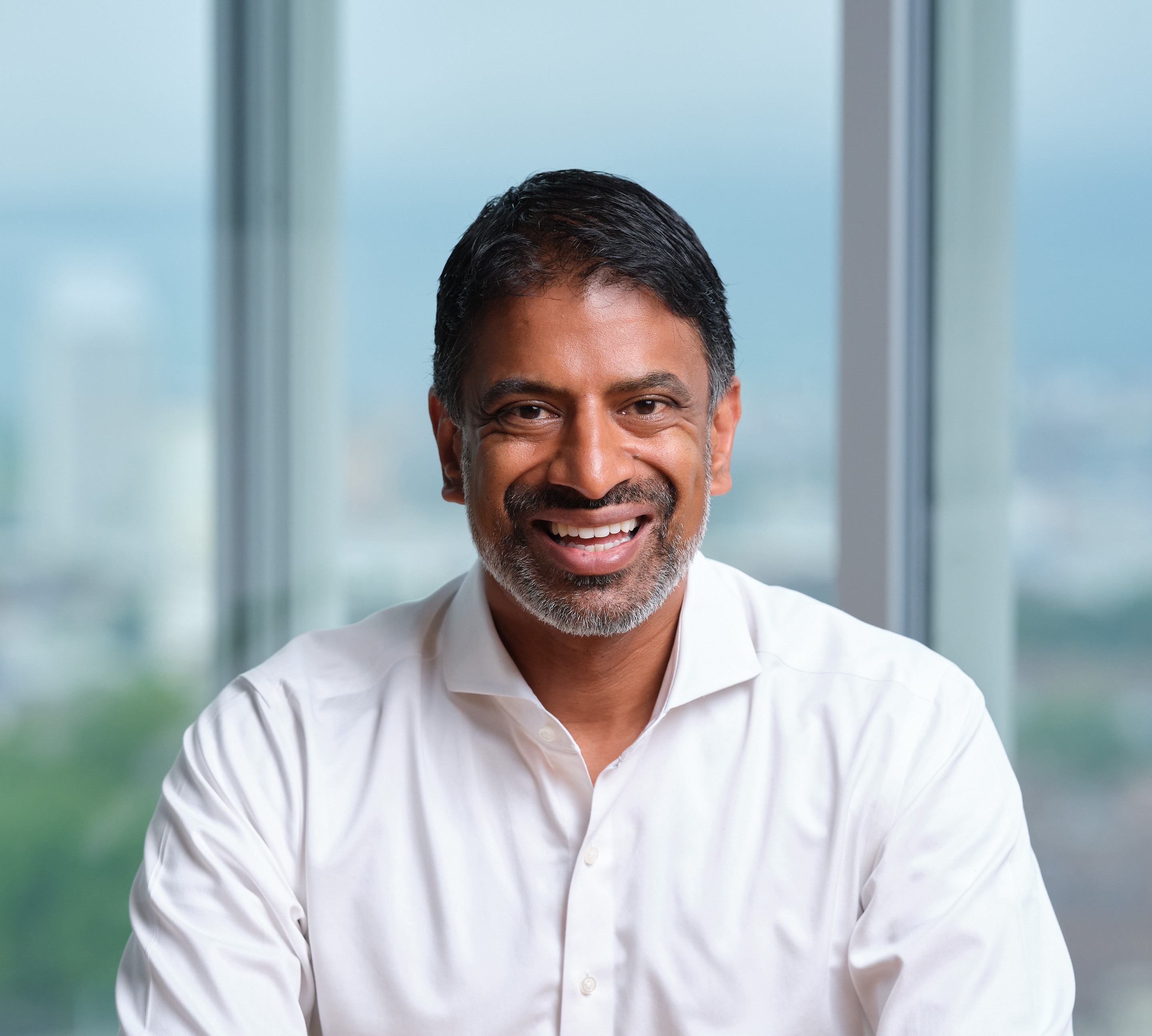
- Born: Vasant Kalathur Narasimhan; August 26, 1976 (age 50); Pittsburgh, Pennsylvania, U.S.
- Education: University of Chicago (BS); Harvard University (MD, MPP)
- Title: CEO of Novartis
- Spouse: Srishti Gupta (m. 2003)
- Children: 2

Vasant Narasimhan (born August 26, 1976) is an American physician and the chief executive officer of Novartis. He succeeded Joseph Jimenez who left Novartis in 2018. He briefly worked at McKinsey before joining Novartis in 2005, where he has held a range of leadership roles, including Global Head of Development for Novartis Vaccines and Global Head of Drug Development & Chief Medical Officer.

== Early life ==
Narasimhan was born in Pittsburgh in 1976 to parents who originated from Tamil Nadu, India. His parents came to the US from India in the 1960’s and early 1970’s and started the Shri Venkateshwara temple in Penn Hills, Pittsburgh which he has stated was influential in his upbringing. Narasimhan's mother was a nuclear engineer for Public Service Electric and Gas Company and his father was an executive at Hoeganaes Corporation.

Narasimhan received his bachelor's degree in biological sciences from University of Chicago, his M.D. from Harvard Medical School and his master's degree in public policy from the John F. Kennedy School of Government.

During his undergraduate and post-graduate studies, he worked on public health programs including the National HIV Treatment Program in Botswana, the American Red Cross in The Gambia and child poverty in India. Paul Farmer and Jim Kim were his mentors and thesis advisors.

== Career ==
=== Early career ===
After his first year of medical school, Narasimhan went to Kolkata, India to work with street children and child laborers for three months. He later worked on malaria and HIV/AIDS in Tanzania and he did his thesis on multidrug resistant tuberculosis in Peru.

He joined McKinsey & Co, as a consultant and engagement manager for two years and was recruited by Novartis in 2005.

He spent eight years working in Novartis Vaccines, and was the Global Head of Development, Novartis Vaccines in the US between 2012 and 2014 before moving to Sandoz as Global Head of Biopharmaceuticals and Oncology Injectables.

From 2014 to 2016, he was the Global Head of Development for Novartis Pharmaceuticals. From 2016 to 2018, he held the role of Global Head of Drug Development and Chief Medical Officer within the company.

=== Novartis chief executive (2017–present) ===
On September 5, 2017, Narasimhan was named CEO of Novartis, succeeding Joseph Jimenez.

He publicly stated his desire to focus Novartis from a diversified company to a pure-play medicines company. He also advocated for development of key technologies and capabilities in advanced therapy platforms, such as cell therapy and gene therapy, RNA therapeutics, and radioligand therapy.

As part of his strategy, Narasimhan has divested the joint consumer healthcare venture to GSK, the spin-off of Alcon, and the exit of a stake in Roche as well as pushed for the acquisition of Advanced Accelerator Applications, Endocyte, AveXis, and The Medicines Company.

In February 2018, three months after becoming CEO, Narasimhan apologized to Novartis employees after it was revealed that Novartis had signed a $1.2 million year-long contract with President Donald Trump's personal attorney Michael Cohen's consulting firm in February 2017.

In 2019, in response to an FDA investigation about manipulated data involving Zolgensma, Narasimhan defended the company's decision to delay informing the FDA and also announced the company was forcing out scientists who were involved in the manipulated data. Brian Kaspar maintained his innocence and was later hired by other gene therapy companies.

As part of a "more comprehensive commitment to ethics”, Narasimhan has moved to settle long standing bribery and anti-trust cases facing Novartis in the US, China, Vietnam and Greece.

== Memberships ==
Narasimhan is a member of the U.S. National Academy of Medicine, a member of the board of fellows of Harvard Medical School, and a member of the Board of Trustees of the University of Chicago. He has served as chair of Pharmaceutical Research and Manufacturers of America (PhRMA), and remains on its board of directors. Narasimhan has been a member of the Council of Foreign Relations since 2026.

He is on the board of African Parks, a nonprofit conservation organization, and since December 2022 is the chair of the board.

In 2026, he was added to the board of Anthropic.

== Recognition ==
In 2015, Fortune listed Narasimhan 7th in their '40 under 40' list. In 2025, he was listed as one of the TIME100 Most Influential People in Health.

== Personal life ==
Narasimhan married Srishti Gupta in 2003, after meeting her at Harvard while organizing an Asian cultural festival. They have two children and live in Basel, Switzerland. Narasimhan is a vegetarian.
