= Losartan/hydrochlorothiazide =

Chemical compound

Combination of
- Losartan: Angiotensin II receptor antagonist
- Hydrochlorothiazide: Thiazide diuretic

Clinical data
- Trade names: Hyzaar, others
- AHFS/Drugs.com: Professional Drug Facts
- License data: US DailyMed: Losartan potassium and hydrochlorothiazide
- Routes of administration: By mouth
- ATC code: C09DA01 (WHO)

Legal status
- Legal status: US: ℞-only; In general: ℞ (Prescription only)

Identifiers
- CAS Number: 156154-37-9
- PubChem CID: 24783652
- KEGG: D07895
- CompTox Dashboard (EPA): DTXSID80166052

Losartan/hydrochlorothiazide, sold under the brand name Hyzaar among others, is a fixed-dose combination medication used to treat high blood pressure when losartan is not sufficient. It consists of losartan, an angiotensin II receptor blocker; and hydrochlorothiazide, a thiazide diuretic. It is taken by mouth.

Common side effects include dizziness, back pain, and upper respiratory tract infections. Serious side effects may include low blood pressure, kidney problems, allergic reactions, and electrolyte problems. Use in pregnancy and breastfeeding is not recommended. Losartan works by blocking the effects of angiotensin II while hydrochlorothiazide works by decreasing the ability of the kidneys to absorb electrolytes.

The combination was approved for medical use in the United States in 1995. It is available as a generic medication. In 2023, it was the 65th most commonly prescribed medication in the United States, with more than 9 million prescriptions.

== Medical uses ==
The combination is indicated for the treatment of hypertension, to lower blood pressure; and for the reduction of the risk of stroke in people with hypertension and left ventricular hypertrophy.

== Side Effects ==
Common side effects include dizziness, headache, back pain, rash, fever, diarrhea, cough, and upper respiratory tract infections. Serious side effects may include low blood pressure, kidney problems, allergic reactions, and electrolyte problems.

== Drug interactions ==
Drug interactions include lithium, agents increasing serum levels of potassium, nonsteroidal anti-inflammatory drugs (NSAIDs), antidiabetic drugs, cholestyramine, and colestipol.

== Mechanisms ==
Losartan works by blocking the effects of angiotensin II by preventing it from binding to the angiotensin I receptor while hydrochlorothiazide works by decreasing the ability of the kidneys to absorb electrolytes. The effects of hydrochlorothiazide indirectly lower the levels of serum potassium. However, with coadministration of losartan which is an angiotensin II receptor antagonist, the low levels of potassium are reversed.

== Society and culture ==
=== Brand names ===
The losartan/hydrochlorothiazide combination preparation is marketed by Merck under the brand name Hyzaar and by Xeno Pharmaceuticals under the name Anzaplus. Merck, Sharp & Dohme market it as Ocsaar Plus in Israel. It is marketed as Cozaar comp in Sweden and South Africa.
