= Joseph Jimenez =

American/Swiss business executive

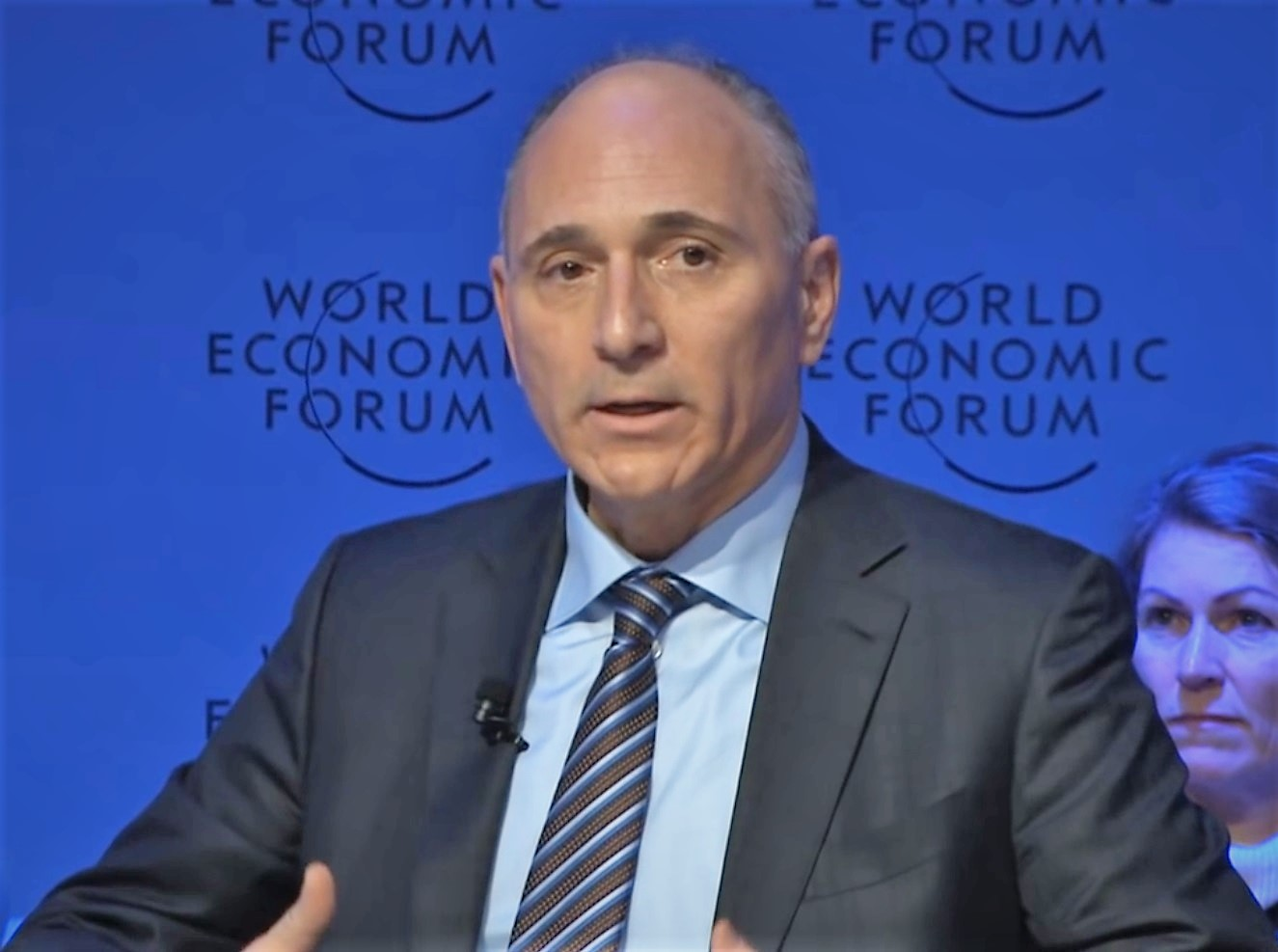
- Jimenez at the World Economic Forum in 2017
- Education: Stanford University; University of California, Berkeley
- Occupation: Former CEO of Novartis

Joseph Jimenez is the former CEO of the Swiss pharmaceutical company Novartis.

== Education ==
Jimenez earned a bachelor's degree from Stanford University in 1982, and an MBA from Berkeley's Haas School of Business in 1984.

== Career ==
=== Early career ===
Jimenez began his career at Clorox before joining ConAgra Foods. Prior to joining Novartis, he was head of H. J. Heinz Company's North American business from 2002 to 2006. He was also a non-executive director of AstraZeneca from 2002 to 2007, as well as an advisor for the Blackstone Group.

== Novartis ==
Jimenez joined Novartis in 2007 as Division Head of Novartis Pharmaceutical and was named CEO in 2010 by his predecessor and Chairman Daniel Vasella.

During his time at Novartis, Jimenez increasingly applied standard business metrics to pharma cash flow, purchasing and competitive bidding, confident that his experience in consumer goods would help to realize improvements in Novartis' operations. His cost-cutting moves, focused mostly on marketing and administration, came steadily, with more than a billion cut in 2010, and even more than that in 2011.

Jimenez joined the board of directors at General Motors on June 9, 2015

Jimenez resigned from Novartis, leaving in February 2018, and was succeeded by Vasant Narasimhan.

He joined the Board of Directors of San Francisco biotech startup uBiome in September 2018 and stepped down in April 2019 to start the biotech venture fund Aditum Bio.

Jimenez also has served on the Board of Directors of Procter & Gamble since 2018, where he is lead independent director. He also served as Chairman of Century Therapeutics, an iPSC derived allogeneic cell therapy company, through August 12, 2025 and is on the Board of Graphite Bio, a gene therapy company. https://investors.centurytx.com/node/9226/html
