= Amlodipine/valsartan =

Antihypertensive medication

Combination of
- Amlodipine: Calcium channel blocker
- Valsartan: Angiotensin II receptor antagonist

Clinical data
- Trade names: Exforge, Copalia, Dafiro
- AHFS/Drugs.com: Professional Drug Facts
- License data: US DailyMed: Amlodipine and valsartan
- Pregnancy category: AU: D
- Routes of administration: By mouth
- ATC code: C09DB01 (WHO)

Legal status
- Legal status: US: ℞-only; EU: Rx-only

Identifiers
- CAS Number: 1190398-97-0
- PubChem CID: 11354874
- ChemSpider: 13092186
- KEGG: D09745; with HCTZ: D10286
- CompTox Dashboard (EPA): DTXSID10180185

Amlodipine/valsartan, sold under the brand name Exforge among others, is a blood pressure lowering combination drug. It contains amlodipine, as the besilate, a dihydropyridine-type calcium channel blocker, and valsartan, an angiotensin II receptor antagonist. This combination is usually well tolerated and effective for the reduction of blood pressure.

The combination was approved for medical use in the European Union in January 2007, and in the United States in June 2007.

The combination is also available with hydrochlorothiazide. It was approved for medical use in the United States in April 2009, and in the European Union in November 2009. The combination of amlodipine/valsartan with hydrochlorothiazide is on the World Health Organization's List of Essential Medicines.
