= Valsartan/hydrochlorothiazide =

Chemical compound

Combination of
- Valsartan: Angiotensin II receptor antagonist
- Hydrochlorothiazide: Thiazide diuretic

Clinical data
- Trade names: Co-vasotec, Diovan HCT, Co-Diovan, others
- AHFS/Drugs.com: Professional Drug Facts
- MedlinePlus: a611032
- License data: US DailyMed: Valsartan hydrochlorothiazide
- Routes of administration: By mouth
- ATC code: C09DA03 (WHO)

Legal status
- Legal status: US: ℞-only; EU: Rx-only

Identifiers
- CAS Number: 186615-83-8
- PubChem CID: 9810581
- KEGG: D09197
- CompTox Dashboard (EPA): DTXSID40171925

Valsartan/hydrochlorothiazide, sold under the brand name Diovan HCT among others, is a medication used to treat high blood pressure when valsartan is not sufficient. It is a combination of valsartan, an angiotensin receptor blocker with hydrochlorothiazide, a diuretic. It is taken by mouth.

Common side effects include dizziness and headaches. Serious side effects may include allergic reactions, electrolyte abnormalities, and glaucoma. Use in pregnancy is not recommended.

The combination was approved for medical use in the United States in 1998. It is available as a generic medication. In 2021, it was the 224th most commonly prescribed medication in the United States, with more than 1 million prescriptions.

== Structure–activity relationship ==
Valsartan has the structure that most ARBs have with the extended biphenyl group and tetrazole which mimics the carboxylate group as a bioisostere but is not held to the same metabolic inactivation. One special note about the molecule in terms of how it differs with other angiotensin receptor blockers, is that the molecule at the 2-prime position has a tetrazole, which has an acidic hydrogen attached to it.

== Medical uses ==
=== High blood pressure ===
Valsartan and hydrochlorothiazide are both medications indicated as initial therapy for high blood pressure. When high blood pressure is not effectively controlled on a single medication they can be used in a combination.

== Contraindications ==
The use of valsartan in pregnancy is avoided due to the potential risk of fetal toxicity. The U.S. Food and Drug Administration has a black box warning for valsartan/hydrochlorothiazide use during pregnancy. The use of hydrochlorothiazide is avoided in those with anuria or severe kidney disease.

== Adverse effects ==
Side effects that are most often seen with this medication include dizziness, hypotension, headache. A clinical trial done on over 7000 participants showed higher rates of nasopharyngitis in those taking valsartan/hydrochlorothiazide (2.4% versus 1.9% in placebo). A dose-related side effect seen is hypotension, occurring in 0.7% of participants on the highest dose of the medication. Risk of hypotension and hyperkalemia increases when valsartan/hydrochlorothiazide is used with ACE inhibitors or aliskiren. Less common side effects that occur less than 1% of the time include angina pectoris, rash, syncope, abdominal pain, and vertigo.

== Overdose ==
Cases of overdose are quite rare. In the event of an overdose people may experience severe hypotension, electrolyte imbalances or abnormal heart rhythms. People are advised to contact emergency services or a poison control centre and are treated based on symptoms.

== Interactions ==
There are a few types of medications that interact with valsartan. Combined use with nonsteroidal anti-inflammatory drugs (NSAID) such as naproxen or ibuprofen can result in kidney injury in people who are elderly, dehydrated, or have reduced kidney function. One study conducted Lapi F., et al. found that there was no increased risk of kidney injury when only using either a diuretic or angiotensin receptor blocker with an NSAID but did find an increased risk when all three medications were used together. Valsartan usage with angiotensin receptor blocker, ACE inhibitors, or aliskiren results in additive side effects.

== Pharmacology ==
Valsartan is an angiotensin II receptor blocker this class of drug competes with angiotensin II for the angiotensin type I (AT_{1}) receptors located throughout the body. Angiotensin II is a key component of the renin-angiotensin-aldosterone system which is responsible for vasoconstriction of blood vessels and promotes release of vasopressin from the posterior pituitary gland of the hypothalamus which helps promote water retention. Aldosterone is also released by the adrenal gland in response to angiotensin II which helps to reabsorb sodium which leads to water reabsorption that results in a rise in blood pressure. Blocking angiotensin II from binding to AT_{1} receptors will in turn prevent it from raising blood pressure which is why angiotensin II receptor blockers are useful medications in the treatment of blood pressure. Hydrochlorothiazide inhibits the NaCl co-transporters in the distal convoluted tubule of the nephrons located in the kidneys which are responsible for the excretion of sodium and chloride in exchange for reabsorption of calcium. Inhibition of the NaCl co-transporters result in water excretion which is believed to be the mechanism of action in diuresis and lowering blood pressure.

== Pharmacokinetics ==
Valsartan has an oral bioavailability of approximately 25% and reaches peak blood concentrations around 2–4 hours after ingestion. The estimated elimination half-life is determined to be approximately 6 hours, volume distribution of 17 litres, and a protein binding of 95% is seen. The elderly may see increases in half life of the drug by up to 35% but dosing adjustment will not typically be warranted, however the drug should be used with caution in severe liver or kidney impairment. Majority of the drug is eliminated through the feces (83%) while only a small portion is eliminated in the urine (13%). Most of the drug excreted is unchanged, only small portion of the drug is metabolized to its inactive form 4-hydroxyvaleryl valsartan, the enzyme suspected to be responsible for this is the liver enzyme CYP2C9. Hydrochlorothiazide has an oral bioavailability of 70% and reaches peak concentration around 1.5–2 hours following ingestion. The half-life is quite variable for this drug and can range from 5–15 hours. This drug is not metabolized and is mostly excreted unchanged in the urine (60-70%). Protein binding ranges between 40 and 70% and volume of distribution varies from 4-8L/kg.
