= Amlodipine/benazepril =

Antihypertensive medication

Combination of
- Amlodipine: Calcium channel blocker
- Benazepril: ACE inhibitor

Clinical data
- Trade names: Lotrel
- AHFS/Drugs.com: Professional Drug Facts
- License data: US DailyMed: Amlodipine and benazepril
- Routes of administration: By mouth
- ATC code: C09BB13 (WHO)

Legal status
- Legal status: US: ℞-only

Identifiers
- CAS Number: 357437-90-2
- PubChem CID: 5746247
- ChemSpider: 4676979
- KEGG: D11069
- CompTox Dashboard (EPA): DTXSID20189285

Amlodipine/benazepril, sold under the brand name Lotrel among others, is a fixed-dose combination medication used to treat high blood pressure. It is a combination of amlodipine, as the besilate, a calcium channel blocker, and benazepril, an angiotensin converting enzyme inhibitor. It may be used if a single agent is not sufficient. It is taken by mouth.

Common side effects include cough, dizziness, and swelling. Serious side effects may include angioedema, myocardial infarction, high blood potassium, liver problems, and low blood pressure. Use in pregnancy is not recommended. Amlodipine works by increasing the size of arteries while benazepril works by decreasing renin-angiotensin-aldosterone system activity.

The combination was approved for medical use in the United States in 1995. It is available as a generic medication. In 2023, it was the 186th most commonly prescribed medication in the United States, with more than 2 million prescriptions.

== Medical uses ==
It is used to treat high blood pressure. It is not a first-line treatment.
