= ACE inhibitor and thiazide combination =

Combination of antihypertensive drugs

An ACE inhibitor and thiazide combination is a drug combination used to treat hypertension (high blood pressure). They are given by mouth. ACE inhibitors reduce the activity of angiotensin-converting enzyme (ACE) which produces angiotensin II, a hormone that constricts blood vessels. Thiazides are a class of diuretics that inhibit the thiazide receptor, thereby increasing urine production and reducing excess water and salt in the body. Several organizations recommend combination therapy for hypertension in cases of failure of a single drug to achieve target blood pressure, or even as a first line treatment for some patients.

== Examples ==
Quinapril/hydrochlorothiazide
Combination of
- Quinapril: Angiotensin converting enzyme inhibitor
- Hydrochlorothiazide: Thiazide diuretic

Clinical data
- Trade names: Accuretic
- AHFS/Drugs.com: Multum Consumer Information
- ATC code: C09BA06 (WHO)

Legal status
- Legal status: US: ℞-only

Identifiers
- ChemSpider: 30797396
- KEGG: D10278

Lisinopril/hydrochlorothiazide
Combination of
- Lisinopril: ACE inhibitor
- Hydrochlorothiazide: Thiazide diuretic

Clinical data
- MedlinePlus: a601070
- Routes of administration: Oral
- ATC code: C09BA03 (WHO)

Legal status
- Legal status: In general: ℞ (Prescription only)

Identifiers
- KEGG: D10268

- Enalapril/hydrochlorothiazide (trade name Enalapril comp), wherein enalapril is the ACE inhibitor and hydrochlorothiazide is the thiazide.
- Quinapril/hydrochlorothiazide (trade name Accuretic)
- Lisinopril/hydrochlorothiazide is marketed as Prinzide, Zestoretic, and many others.

=== Fosinopril/hydrochlorothiazide ===
Fosinopril/hydrochlorothiazide
Combination of
- Fosinopril: Angiotensin converting enzyme inhibitor
- Hydrochlorothiazide: Thiazide diuretic

Clinical data
- Trade names: Monopril HCT
- Pregnancy category: C (1st trimester); D (2nd & 3rd trimesters)
- Routes of administration: Oral
- ATC code: C09BA09 (WHO)

Legal status
- Legal status: In general: ℞ (Prescription only)

Fosinopril/hydrochlorothiazide (trade name Monopril HCT) has a boxed warning about its risk to cause morbidity and mortality in the baby when being used during pregnancy (second and third trimesters).

The FDA modified its labeling in February 2009 to include a precaution of drug interaction with gold. "Nitritoid reactions (symptoms include facial flushing, nausea, vomiting and hypotension) have been reported rarely in patients on therapy with injectable gold (sodium aurothiomalate) and concomitant ACE inhibitor therapy including Monopril/Monopril HCT."

== See also ==
- Perindopril/indapamide, a combination of an ACE inhibitor and a thiazide-like diuretic
