= C30H46NO7P =

The molecular formula C_{30}H_{46}NO_{7}P (molar mass: 563.66 g/mol, exact mass: 563.3012 u) may refer to:

- Ceronapril, a phosphonate ACE inhibitor that was never marketed
- Fosinopril, an angiotensin converting enzyme (ACE) inhibitor
