= Allocoprococcus comes =

Scientific classification
- Domain: Bacteria
- Kingdom: Bacillati
- Phylum: Bacillota
- Class: Clostridia
- Order: Eubacteriales
- Family: Lachnospiraceae
- Genus: Allocoprococcus
- Species: A. comes

Binomial name
- Allocoprococcus comes (Holdeman and Moore 1974) Yamamoto et al. 2026

Synonyms
- Coprococcus comes Holdeman and Moore 1974 (Approved Lists 1980)

Species of bacterium

Allocoprococcus comes is an obligately anaerobic, Gram-positive, non-motile bacterium in the family Lachnospiraceae. It was originally isolated from human feces. It is the type species of the genus Allocoprococcus.

The species was originally described in 1974 as Coprococcus comes Genome-based analyses later showed that it was phylogenetically distinct from the type species of Coprococcus. In 2026, it was transferred to the newly established genus Allocoprococcus as A. comes. Coprococcus comes is therefore a homotypic synonym of the current name. The specific epithet comes is Latin for "companion" or "fellow traveller", referring to the organism's occurrence in human feces.

== Description ==
Cells are elongated cocci with tapered ends, measuring about 1.6–2.3 μm in length and occurring in chains of approximately 4–20 cells. In culture, the organism forms translucent, lenticular or bifoliate colonies.

Members of this species ferment carbohydrates, including glucose, arabinose and xylose.

== Drug metabolism ==
A 2022 study found that the bacterium hydrolyzed the ester ACE inhibitors quinapril and ramipril. In spontaneously hypertensive rats, administration of the bacterium reduced the blood-pressure-lowering effect of quinapril; the non-ester ACE inhibitor lisinopril was not affected.
