= Trandolapril/verapamil =

Combination drug

Combination of
- Trandolapril: Calcium channel blocker
- Verapamil: ACE inhibitor

Clinical data
- Trade names: Tarka
- ATC code: C09BB10 (WHO)

Legal status
- Legal status: EU: Rx-only

Identifiers
- CAS Number: 146994-90-3
- KEGG: D10282

Trandolapril/verapamil (Tarka) is an oral antihypertensive medication that combines a slow release formulation of verapamil hydrochloride, a calcium channel blocker, and an immediate release formulation of trandolapril, an ACE inhibitor. The patent, held by Abbott Laboratories, expired on February 24, 2015.

This combination medication contains angiotensin-converting enzyme (ACE) inhibitor and calcium channel blocker and is prescribed for high blood pressure.
