= Richard Wolfenden =

American biochemist (1935–2025)

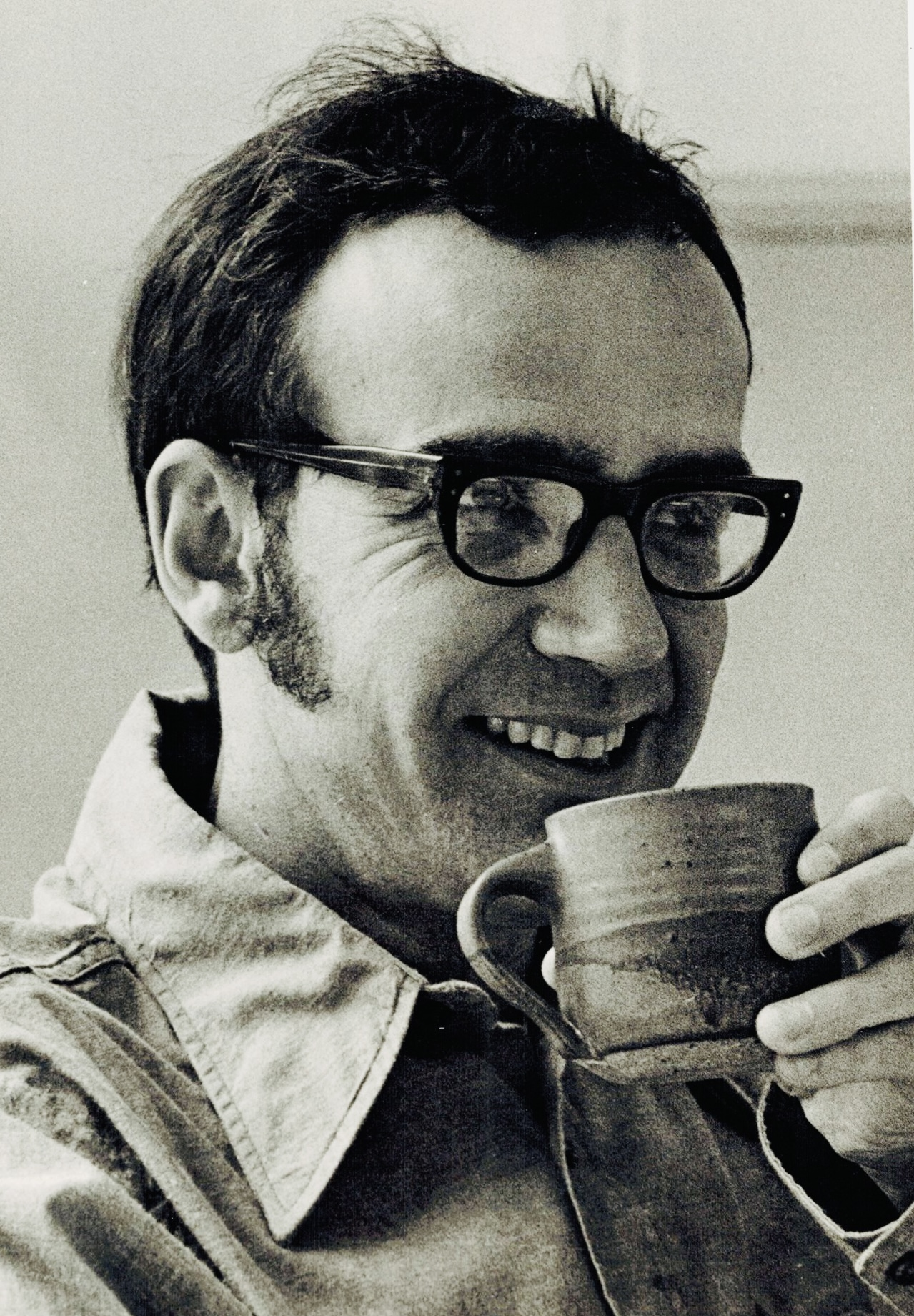
- Born: 17 May 1935; Oxford, England
- Died: 22 October 2025 (aged 90)
- Education: Princeton University (A.B.), Oxford University, Rockefeller University (Ph.D.)
- Known for: Enzyme kinetics
- Scientific career
- Fields: Biochemistry
- Workplaces: University of North Carolina at Chapel Hill

Richard Vance Wolfenden NAS AAA&S (17 May 1935 – 22 October 2025) was a professor of chemistry, biochemistry and biophysics at the University of North Carolina at Chapel Hill. He was both elected to the National Academy of Sciences and appointed as Fellow of the American Academy of Arts and Sciences in 2002. His research involved the kinetics of enzymatic reactions, and his laboratory has made significant contributions to the understanding of catalytic rate enhancements.

== Early life and education ==
Wolfenden was born to John Hulton Wolfenden and Josephine Vance Wolfenden. He spent part of his childhood in Oxford, England, until his family was relocated during WWII for his father to serve as a Principal Scientific Officer for the British Commonwealth in Washington, D.C. In 1947, his family moved to Hanover, N.H. when his father joined to Department of Chemistry at Dartmouth College.

Wolfenden earned his A.B. in chemistry from Princeton University in 1956, after completing a senior thesis titled "Metabolism of Cobalt and Vitamin B_{12} in Rats." He then received a bachelor's degree and a master's degree in animal physiology from Exeter College, University of Oxford.

He earned his Ph.D. from the Rockefeller University in 1964 (then known as the Rockefeller Institute) in biochemistry. His dissertation was titled “Some Characteristics Of The Linkage Of Amino Acids To Soluble-RNA.”

== Career ==
Wolfenden initially taught at Princeton University, but in 1970 he joined the faculty at the University of North Carolina as associate professor of biochemistry. He became full professor in 1973, and was later named the Alumni Distinguished Professor of Biochemistry & Biophysics in the School of Medicine with a joint appointment in the department of chemistry. Wolfenden was elected as a member of the American Academy of Arts and Sciences in 2002. He was known for his work on enzyme mechanisms, including their catalytic power, and on the water affinities of biological compounds. The research from Wolfenden's laboratory contributed to the development of ACE inhibitors, which is used for the treatment of hypertension and heart failure.

== Death ==
Wolfenden died on 22 October 2025, at the age of 90.
