= Aliskiren/hydrochlorothiazide =

Pharmaceutical drug

Combination of
- Aliskiren: Renin inhibitor
- Hydrochlorothiazide: Diuretic

Clinical data
- Trade names: Tekturna HCT, Rasilez HCT, others
- AHFS/Drugs.com: Professional Drug Facts
- License data: US DailyMed: Aliskiren_hemifumarate_and_hydrochlorothiazide
- Routes of administration: By mouth
- ATC code: C09XA52 (WHO)

Legal status
- Legal status: US: ℞-only; EU: Rx-only

Identifiers
- KEGG: D10289

Aliskiren/hydrochlorothiazide, sold under the brand name Tekturna HCT among others, is a fixed-dose combination medication for the treatment of hypertension (high blood pressure). It contains aliskiren, a renin inhibitor, and hydrochlorothiazide, a diuretic. It is taken by mouth.

The most common side effect is diarrhea.

Aliskiren/hydrochlorothiazide was approved for medical use in the United States in January 2008, and for use in the European Union in January 2009.

== Medical uses ==
Aliskiren/hydrochlorothiazide is indicated for the treatment of essential hypertension in adults.
