= C23H21N7O =

The molecular formula C_{23}H_{21}N_{7}O may refer to:

- Entospletinib, an experimental drug, an inhibitor of spleen tyrosine kinase
- Tasosartan, an angiotensin II receptor antagonist
