= Temocapril =

Chemical compound

Clinical data
- AHFS/Drugs.com: International Drug Names
- ATC code: C09AA14 (WHO)

Identifiers
- IUPAC name: 2-[(2S)-6-[[(2S)-1-ethoxy-1-oxo-4-phenylbutan-2-yl]amino]-5-oxo-2-thiophen-2-yl-1,4-thiazepan-4-yl]acetic acid
- CAS Number: 111902-57-9
- PubChem CID: 71323
- ChemSpider: 64431
- UNII: 18IZ008EU6
- KEGG: D08566
- ChEMBL: ChEMBL2110627
- CompTox Dashboard (EPA): DTXSID3048239

Chemical and physical data
- Formula: C_{23}H_{28}N_{2}O_{5}S_{2}
- Molar mass: 476.61 g·mol^{−1}
- 3D model (JSmol): Interactive image
- SMILES: CCOC(=O)[C@H](CCc1ccccc1)NC2CS[C@@H](CN(C2=O)CC(=O)O)c3cccs3
- InChI: InChI=1S/C23H28N2O5S2/c1-2-30-23(29)17(11-10-16-7-4-3-5-8-16)24-18-15-32-20(19-9-6-12-31-19)13-25(22(18)28)14-21(26)27/h3-9,12,17-18,20,24H,2,10-11,13-15H2,1H3,(H,26,27)/t17-,18?,20-/m0/s1; Key:FIQOFIRCTOWDOW-DXCJPMOASA-N

Temocapril (also known as temocaprilum [Latin]; brand name Acecol) is an ACE inhibitor. It was not approved for use in the US.

It is administered as inactive prodrug, then converted to its active metabolite, temocaprilat.

It was patented in 1984 and approved for medical use in 1994.
