= Perindopril/indapamide =

Combination medication

Combination of
- Perindopril: ACE inhibitor
- Indapamide: Thiazide-like diuretic

Clinical data
- Trade names: Preterax, Noliprel, Coversyl Plus
- Routes of administration: By mouth
- ATC code: C09BA04 (WHO)

Legal status
- Legal status: AU: S4 (Prescription only); CA: ℞-only; In general: ℞ (Prescription only)

Identifiers
- CAS Number: 182176-83-6
- PubChem CID: 9940214
- ChemSpider: 8115834
- CompTox Dashboard (EPA): DTXSID001027112

Perindopril/indapamide (marketed as Preterax, Coversyl Plus and Noliprel) is a combination medication which contains perindopril (an ACE inhibitor) and indapamide (a thiazide-like diuretic) both of which are used for the treatment of essential hypertension (high blood pressure).

== Medical uses ==
High blood pressure

=== Administration ===
One tablet daily, preferably to be taken in the morning and before a meal.

Elderly: Normal dosage.

Kidney failure: Creatinine clearance (CrCl) >30 mL/min: no dosage modification. If CrCl <30 mL/min, treatment is contraindicated.

== Contraindications ==
Absolute contraindications to taking perindopril/indapamide include a known allergy to perindopril, indapamide, or sulfonamides; history of Quincke's edema linked to previous ACE inhibitor therapy; end-stage kidney disease; serious liver disease; high levels of potassium in the blood; pregnancy; and lactation.

Relative contraindications to using this medication include combination therapy with lithium, potassium salts, potassium-sparing diuretics, and certain medicines which can cause abnormal heart rhythms.

== Side effects ==
Side effects of perindopril/indapamide may include weakness, dizziness, headache, mood swings and/or sleep disturbances. Additionally, cramps, low blood pressure, allergic reactions, skin rashes, gastrointestinal disorders, dry cough, erectile dysfunctions, dry mouth, and a risk of dehydration in the elderly and in people who have congestive heart failure.

Immunosuppressed patients. Hemodialysis: risk of anaphylactoid reaction during hemodialysis with polyacrylonitrile membranes. Liver impairment.

Caution is recommended when prescribing perindopril/indapamide to people with electrolyte disorders, diabetes, gout, low blood pressure, or strict sodium-free diets, heart or kidney failure, atherosclerosis, renal artery stenosis, and in elderly people.

== Pharmacology ==
Using a fixed combination of an ACE inhibitor and a chlorosulfamoyl diuretic leads to additive synergy of the antihypertensive effects of the two constituents. Its pharmacological properties are derived from those of each of the components taken separately, in addition to those due to the additive synergistic action of the two constituents, when combined, on vascular endothelium, arteriolocapillary microcirculation, and the target organs of hypertension.

== Drug interactions ==
Not recommended: combinations with lithium, potassium-sparing diuretics, potassium (salts), antiarrhythmic drugs which can cause torsades de pointes, anesthetic drugs, cytostatics or immunosuppressive agents.
