= Enalapril/hydrochlorothiazide =

Combination drug

Combination of
- Enalapril: ACE inhibitor
- Hydrochlorothiazide: Thiazide diuretic

Clinical data
- Trade names: Vaseretic, others
- AHFS/Drugs.com: Monograph
- MedlinePlus: a601047
- License data: US DailyMed: Enalapril maleate and hydrochlorothiazide
- Pregnancy category: AU: D
- Routes of administration: By mouth
- ATC code: C09BA02 (WHO)

Legal status
- Legal status: US: ℞-only; In general: ℞ (Prescription only)

Identifiers
- KEGG: D10277

Enalapril/hydrochlorothiazide, sold under the brand name Vaseretic among others, is a fixed-dose combination medication used for the treatment of hypertension (high blood pressure). It contains enalapril, an angiotensin converting enzyme inhibitor, and hydrochlorothiazide a diuretic. It is taken by mouth.

The most frequent side effects include dizziness, headache, fatigue, and cough.

== History ==
Enalapril/hydrochlorothiazide was approved for medical use in the United States in October 1986.
