= Quinaprilat =

Chemical compound

Clinical data
- Other names: CI-928
- ATC code: None

Identifiers
- IUPAC name: (3S)-2-[(2S)-2-[[(1S)-1-carboxy-3-phenylpropyl]amino]propanoyl]-3,4-dihydro-1H-isoquinoline-3-carboxylic acid
- CAS Number: 82768-85-2
- IUPHAR/BPS: 6352
- ChemSpider: 97106
- UNII: 34SSX5LDE5
- ChEMBL: ChEMBL1733
- CompTox Dashboard (EPA): DTXSID40868904

Chemical and physical data
- Formula: C_{23}H_{26}N_{2}O_{5}
- Molar mass: 410.470 g·mol^{−1}
- 3D model (JSmol): Interactive image
- SMILES: C[C@@H](C(=O)N1CC2=CC=CC=C2C[C@H]1C(=O)O)N[C@@H](CCC3=CC=CC=C3)C(=O)O
- InChI: InChI=1S/C23H26N2O5/c1-15(24-19(22(27)28)12-11-16-7-3-2-4-8-16)21(26)25-14-18-10-6-5-9-17(18)13-20(25)23(29)30/h2-10,15,19-20,24H,11-14H2,1H3,(H,27,28)(H,29,30)/t15-,19-,20-/m0/s1; Key:FLSLEGPOVLMJMN-YSSFQJQWSA-N

Quinaprilat is the active metabolite of quinapril.
