= Spirapril =

Chemical compound

Clinical data
- Trade names: Renormax
- AHFS/Drugs.com: International Drug Names
- Pregnancy category: D
- Routes of administration: Oral
- ATC code: C09AA11 (WHO)

Legal status
- Legal status: In general: ℞ (Prescription only)

Pharmacokinetic data
- Bioavailability: 50%
- Metabolism: converted to spiraprilat
- Elimination half-life: 30 to 35 hours
- Excretion: Hepatic and renal

Identifiers
- IUPAC name: (8S)-7-[(2S)-2-[[(2S)-1-ethoxy-1-oxo-4-phenylbutan-2-yl]amino]propanoyl]-1,4-dithia-7-azaspiro[4.4]nonane-8-carboxylic acid
- CAS Number: 83647-97-6
- PubChem CID: 5311447
- IUPHAR/BPS: 6575
- DrugBank: DB01348
- ChemSpider: 4470933
- UNII: 96U2K78I3V
- KEGG: D08529
- ChEBI: CHEBI:135756
- ChEMBL: ChEMBL431
- CompTox Dashboard (EPA): DTXSID1044300

Chemical and physical data
- Formula: C_{22}H_{30}N_{2}O_{5}S_{2}
- Molar mass: 466.61 g·mol^{−1}
- 3D model (JSmol): Interactive image
- SMILES: O=C(OCC)[C@@H](N[C@H](C(=O)N2[C@H](C(=O)O)CC1(SCCS1)C2)C)CCc3ccccc3
- InChI: InChI=1S/C22H30N2O5S2/c1-3-29-21(28)17(10-9-16-7-5-4-6-8-16)23-15(2)19(25)24-14-22(30-11-12-31-22)13-18(24)20(26)27/h4-8,15,17-18,23H,3,9-14H2,1-2H3,(H,26,27)/t15-,17-,18-/m0/s1; Key:HRWCVUIFMSZDJS-SZMVWBNQSA-N

Spirapril, sold under the brand name Renormax among others, is an ACE inhibitor antihypertensive drug used to treat hypertension. It belongs to dicarboxy group of ACE inhibitors.

It was patented in 1980 and approved for medical use in 1995.

== Chemistry ==
Like many ACE inhibitors, this prodrug is converted to the active metabolite spiraprilat following oral administration. Unlike other members of the group, it is eliminated both by renal and hepatic routes, which may allow for greater use in patients with renal impairment. However, data on its effect upon the renal function are conflicting.
