= Aliskiren/amlodipine/hydrochlorothiazide =

Pharmaceutical drug

Combination of
- Aliskiren: Renin inhibitor
- Amlodipine: Calcium channel blocker
- Hydrochlorothiazide: Diuretic

Clinical data
- Trade names: Amturnide
- AHFS/Drugs.com: Micromedex Detailed Consumer Information
- License data: US DailyMed: Amturnide
- Routes of administration: By mouth
- ATC code: C09XA54 (WHO)

Legal status
- Legal status: US: ℞-only

Identifiers
- PubChem CID: 56841821
- KEGG: D10291

Chemical and physical data
- Formula: C_{57}H_{86}Cl_{2}N_{8}O_{15}S_{2}
- Molar mass: 1258.38 g·mol^{−1}
- 3D model (JSmol): Interactive image
- SMILES: CCOC(=O)C1=C(NC(=C(C1C2=CC=CC=C2Cl)C(=O)OC)C)COCCN.CC(C)C(CC1=CC(=C(C=C1)OC)OCCCOC)CC(C(CC(C(C)C)C(=O)NCC(C)(C)C(=O)N)O)N.C1NC2=CC(=C(C=C2S(=O)(=O)N1)S(=O)(=O)N)Cl
- InChI: InChI=1S/C30H53N3O6.C20H25ClN2O5.C7H8ClN3O4S2/c1-19(2)22(14-21-10-11-26(38-8)27(15-21)39-13-9-12-37-7)16-24(31)25(34)17-23(20(3)4)28(35)33-18-30(5,6)29(32)36;1-4-28-20(25)18-15(11-27-10-9-22)23-12(2)16(19(24)26-3)17(18)13-7-5-6-8-14(13)21;8-4-1-5-7(2-6(4)16(9,12)13)17(14,15)11-3-10-5/h10-11,15,19-20,22-25,34H,9,12-14,16-18,31H2,1-8H3,(H2,32,36)(H,33,35);5-8,17,23H,4,9-11,22H2,1-3H3;1-2,10-11H,3H2,(H2,9,12,13)/t22-,23+,24-,25-;;/m0../s1; Key:YJDDFLDXUPNQTO-WMEHTASQSA-N

Aliskiren/amlodipine/hydrochlorothiazide, sold under the brand name Amturnide, is a fixed-dose combination medication that is used to treat high blood pressure. It contains aliskiren, a renin inhibitor; amlodipine, as the besylate, a calcium channel blocker; and hydrochlorothiazide, a thiazide diuretic. It is taken by mouth.

It was approved for medical use in the United States in December 2010. Amturnide was withdrawn by Novartis from the US market in 2017.
