= C26H32N2O5 =

The molecular formula C_{26}H_{32}N_{2}O_{5} (molar mass: 452.54 g/mol, exact mass: 452.2311 u) may refer to:

- Ensaculin (KA-672)
- Delapril
