= Delapril =

Chemical compound

Clinical data
- AHFS/Drugs.com: International Drug Names
- ATC code: C09AA12 (WHO)

Identifiers
- IUPAC name: 2-[2,3-dihydro-1H-inden-2-yl-[(2S)-2-[[(2S)-1-ethoxy-1-oxo-4-phenylbutan-2-yl]amino]propanoyl]amino]acetic acid
- CAS Number: 83435-66-9
- PubChem CID: 5362116
- ChemSpider: 4514931
- UNII: W77UAL9THI
- KEGG: D07781
- ChEMBL: ChEMBL2106126
- CompTox Dashboard (EPA): DTXSID101016742

Chemical and physical data
- Formula: C_{26}H_{32}N_{2}O_{5}
- Molar mass: 452.551 g·mol^{−1}
- 3D model (JSmol): Interactive image
- SMILES: O=C(OCC)[C@@H](N[C@H](C(=O)N(CC(=O)O)C2Cc1ccccc1C2)C)CCc3ccccc3
- InChI: InChI=1S/C26H32N2O5/c1-3-33-26(32)23(14-13-19-9-5-4-6-10-19)27-18(2)25(31)28(17-24(29)30)22-15-20-11-7-8-12-21(20)16-22/h4-12,18,22-23,27H,3,13-17H2,1-2H3,(H,29,30)/t18-,23-/m0/s1; Key:WOUOLAUOZXOLJQ-MBSDFSHPSA-N

Delapril (INN, also known as alindapril) is an ACE inhibitor used as an antihypertensive drug in some European and Asian countries but not in America. It is taken orally, available in 15 mg and 30 mg tablets.

== Mechanism ==
Delapril is a prodrug; it is converted into two active metabolites, 5-hydroxy delapril diacid and delapril diacid. These metabolites bind completely to and inhibit angiotensin-converting enzyme (ACE), hence blocking angiotensin I to angiotensin II conversion. The resulting vasodilation prevents the vasoconstrictive effects of angiotensin II. Angiotensin II-induced aldosterone secretion by the adrenal cortex is also decreased by Delapril, leading to increases in excretion of sodium and therefore increases water outflow.
