= Ceronapril =

Chemical compound

Clinical data
- AHFS/Drugs.com: Monograph
- ATC code: C09AA09 (WHO)

Identifiers
- IUPAC name: 1-[(2S)-6-Amino-2-hydroxyhexanoyl]-L-proline, hydrogen (4-phenyl-butyl)phosphonate
- CAS Number: 111223-26-8
- PubChem CID: 189729
- ChemSpider: 164789
- UNII: X3MM60SOVP
- KEGG: D03440
- CompTox Dashboard (EPA): DTXSID80891418

Chemical and physical data
- Formula: C_{30}H_{46}NO_{7}P
- Molar mass: 563.672 g·mol^{−1}
- 3D model (JSmol): Interactive image
- SMILES: C1C[C@H](N(C1)C(=O)[C@H](CCCCN)OP(=O)(CCCCC2=CC=CC=C2)O)C(=O)O
- InChI: InChI=1S/C30H46NO7P/c1-4-28(33)37-30(22(2)3)38-39(36,18-12-11-15-23-13-7-5-8-14-23)21-27(32)31-20-25(19-26(31)29(34)35)24-16-9-6-10-17-24/h5,7-8,13-14,22,24-26,30H,4,6,9-12,15-21H2,1-3H3,(H,34,35)/t25-,26+,30?,39-/m1/s1; Key:BIDNLKIUORFRQP-YYTCENNOSA-N

Ceronapril (INN, proposed trade names Ceranapril, Novopril) is a phosphonate ACE inhibitor that was never marketed.
