= Perindopril =

High blood pressure medication

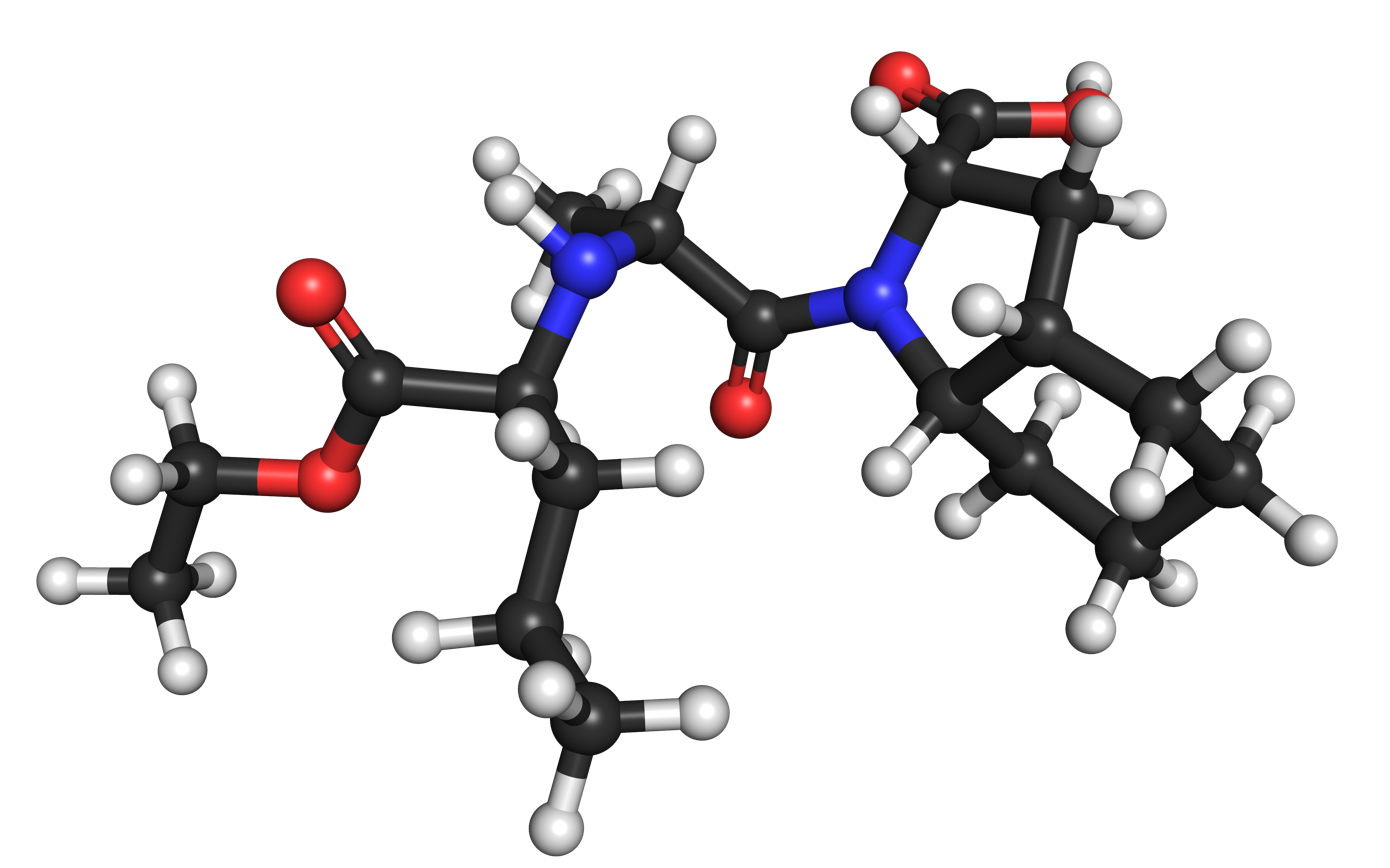
- Above: molecular structure of perindopril Below: 3D representation of a perindopril molecule

Clinical data
- Trade names: Coversyl, Coversum, Aceon
- AHFS/Drugs.com: Perindopril Monograph
- MedlinePlus: Perindopril
- License data: US DailyMed: Perindopril
- Routes of administration: By mouth
- ATC code: C09AA04 (WHO) C09BA04 (WHO) (with diuretics) C09BB04 (WHO) (with amlodipine)

Legal status
- Legal status: CA: ℞-only; UK: POM (Prescription only); US: ℞-only

Pharmacokinetic data
- Bioavailability: 24%
- Protein binding: 20%
- Metabolism: Kidney
- Elimination half-life: 1–17 hours for perindoprilat (active metabolite)

Identifiers
- IUPAC name: (2S,3aS,7aS)-1-[(2S)-2-{[(2S)-1-ethoxy-1-oxopentan-2-yl]amino}propanoyl]-octahydro-1H-indole-2-carboxylic acid
- CAS Number: 82834-16-0
- PubChem CID: 107807
- IUPHAR/BPS: 6367
- DrugBank: DB00790
- ChemSpider: 96956
- UNII: Y5GMK36KGY
- KEGG: D03753
- ChEBI: CHEBI:8024
- ChEMBL: ChEMBL1581
- CompTox Dashboard (EPA): DTXSID6023440
- ECHA InfoCard: 100.120.843

Chemical and physical data
- Formula: C_{19}H_{32}N_{2}O_{5}
- Molar mass: 368.474 g·mol^{−1}
- 3D model (JSmol): Interactive image
- SMILES: O=C(OCC)[C@@H](N[C@H](C(=O)N1[C@H](C(=O)O)C[C@@H]2CCCC[C@H]12)C)CCC
- InChI: InChI=1S/C19H32N2O5/c1-4-8-14(19(25)26-5-2)20-12(3)17(22)21-15-10-7-6-9-13(15)11-16(21)18(23)24/h12-16,20H,4-11H2,1-3H3,(H,23,24)/t12-,13-,14-,15-,16-/m0/s1; Key:IPVQLZZIHOAWMC-QXKUPLGCSA-N

Perindopril is a medication used to treat high blood pressure, heart failure, or stable coronary artery disease.

As a long-acting ACE inhibitor, perindopril works by inhibiting production of the vasoconstriction hormone, angiotensin, thereby relaxing blood vessels, increasing urine output, and decreasing blood volume, leading to a reduction of blood pressure. It also increases blood renin activity and decreases aldosterone secretion, causing increased urine production and excretion of sodium.

As a prodrug, perindopril is hydrolyzed in the liver to its active metabolite, perindoprilat. It was patented in 1980 and approved for medical use in 1988. Perindopril is taken in the form of perindopril arginine/amlodipine or perindopril erbumine. Both forms are therapeutically equivalent and interchangeable. The combination drug of perindopril, amlodipine, and indapamide is on the World Health Organization's List of Essential Medicines.

Perindopril should not be used during pregnancy, as it may harm the fetus. Some people may have allergic reactions to perindopril, while common side-effects may include cough, headache, dizziness, diarrhea, or upset stomach.

In Australia during 2023-24, it was the fourth-most prescribed drug.

== Medical uses ==
Perindopril shares the indications of ACE inhibitors as a class, including essential hypertension, stable coronary artery disease (reduction of risk of cardiac events in patients with a history of myocardial infarction or revascularization), treatment of symptomatic coronary artery disease or heart failure, and diabetic nephropathy.

=== Combination therapy ===
==== With indapamide ====
In combination with indapamide, perindopril has been shown to significantly reduce the progression of chronic kidney disease and renal complications in patients with type 2 diabetes. In addition, the Perindopril pROtection aGainst REcurrent Stroke Study (PROGRESS) found that whilst perindopril monotherapy demonstrated no significant benefit in reducing recurrent strokes when compared to placebo, the addition of low dose indapamide to perindopril therapy was associated with larger reductions in both blood pressure lowering and recurrent stroke risk in patients with pre-existing cerebrovascular disease, irrespective of their blood pressure. There is evidence to support the use of perindopril and indapamide combination over perindopril monotherapy to prevent strokes and improve mortality in patients with a history of stroke, transient ischaemic attack or other cardiovascular disease.

==== With amlodipine ====
The Anglo-Scandinavian Cardiac Outcomes Trial-Blood Pressure Lowering Arm (ASCOT-BLA) was a 2005 landmark trial that compared the effects of the established therapy of the combination of atenolol and bendroflumethiazide to the new drug combination of amlodipine and perindopril (trade names Viacoram, AceryCal). The study of more than 19,000 patients worldwide was terminated earlier than anticipated because it clearly demonstrated a statistically significant improvement in mortality and cardiovascular outcomes with the newer treatment. The combination of amlodipine and perindopril remains in the current treatment guidelines for hypertension.

== Warning and adverse effects ==
Perindopril may cause death or birth defects of a fetus if taken by the mother during pregnancy. It is poisonous in children and is not prescribed for them.

It may cause allergic reactions, and may have adverse effects in people with heart, liver or kidney problems.

== Precautions ==
- Assess kidney function before and during treatment where appropriate.
- Renovascular hypertension
- Surgery/anesthesia
- An analysis on the PROGRESS trial showed that perindopril has key benefits in reducing cardiovascular events by 30% in patients with chronic kidney disease defined as a CrCl <60ml/min. A 2016 and 2017 meta-analysis review looking at ACE inhibitors demonstrated a reduction in cardiovascular events but also slowed the decline of renal failure by 39% when compared to placebo. These studies included patients with moderate to severe kidney disease and those on dialysis.
- Its renoprotective benefits of decreasing blood pressure and removing filtration pressure is highlighted in a 2016 review. ACE inhibitor can result in an initial increase of serum creatinine, but mostly returns to baseline in a few weeks in majority of patients. It has been suggested that increased monitoring, especially in advanced kidney failure, will minimise any related risk and improve long-term benefits.
- Use cautiously in patients with sodium or volume depletion due to potential excessive hypotensive effects of renin-angiotensin blockade causing symptomatic hypotension. Careful monitoring or short-term dose reduction of diuretics prior to commencing perindopril is recommended to prevent this potential effect. A diuretic may later be given in combination if necessary; potassium-sparing diuretics are not recommended in combination with perindopril due to the risk of hyperkalaemia.
- Combination with neuroleptics or imipramine-type drugs may increase the blood pressure lowering effect. Serum lithium concentrations may rise during lithium therapy.

== Side effects ==
Usually mild at the start of treatment, side effects may include cough, fatigue, headache, nausea, or upset stomach, among other minor effects.

== Composition ==
Each tablet contains 2, 4, or 8 mg of the tert-butylamine salt of perindopril. Perindopril is also available under the trade name Coversyl Plus, containing 4 mg of perindopril combined with 1.25 mg indapamide, a thiazide-like diuretic.

In Australia, each tablet contains 2.5, 5, or 10 mg of perindopril arginine. Perindopril is also available under the trade name Coversyl Plus, containing 5 mg of perindopril arginine combined with 1.25 mg indapamide and Coversyl Plus LD, containing 2.5 mg of perindopril arginine combined with 0.625 mg indapamide.

The efficacy and tolerability of a fixed-dose combination of 4 mg perindopril and 5 mg amlodipine, a calcium channel antagonist, is used.

== Society and culture ==
=== Brand names ===
Perindopril is available under the following brand names among others:

- Aceon (with erbumine (tert-Butylamine))
- Acertil
- Actiprex
- Armix
- Idaprex
- Coverene
- Coverex
- Coversum (with arginine)
- Coversyl (with arginine)
- Covinace
- Indapril
- Perindo
- Perineva
- Prenessa
- Prestalia
- Prestarium
- Preterax
- Prexanil
- Prexum
- Procaptan
- Provinace
- Pericard
- Percarnil
- Perindal
- Repres
- Relika

=== Marketing ===
In July 2014, the European Commission imposed fines of €427,700,000 on Laboratoires Servier and five companies which produce generics due to Servier's abuse of their dominant market position, in breach of European Union Competition law. Servier's strategy included acquiring the principal source of generic production of perindopril and entering into several pay-for-delay agreements with potential generic competitors.
