= Spiraprilat =

Chemical compound

Identifiers
- IUPAC name: (8S)-7-[(2S)-2-{[(1S)-1-Carboxy-3-phenylpropyl]amino}propanoyl]-1,4-dithia-7-azaspiro[4.4]nonane-8-carboxylic acid
- CAS Number: 83602-05-5
- PubChem CID: 3033702
- IUPHAR/BPS: 6576
- ChemSpider: 2298317
- UNII: QS56V5Y7EC
- ChEBI: CHEBI:141522
- ChEMBL: ChEMBL579
- CompTox Dashboard (EPA): DTXSID30232453

Chemical and physical data
- Formula: C_{20}H_{26}N_{2}O_{5}S_{2}
- Molar mass: 438.56 g·mol^{−1}
- 3D model (JSmol): Interactive image
- SMILES: C[C@H](N[C@@H](CCc1ccccc1)C(=O)O)C(=O)N2CC3(C[C@H]2C(=O)O)SCCS3
- InChI: InChI=1S/C20H26N2O5S2/c1-13(21-15(18(24)25)8-7-14-5-3-2-4-6-14)17(23)22-12-20(28-9-10-29-20)11-16(22)19(26)27/h2-6,13,15-16,21H,7-12H2,1H3,(H,24,25)(H,26,27)/t13-,15-,16-/m0/s1; Key:FMMDBLMCSDRUPA-BPUTZDHNSA-N

Spiraprilat is the active metabolite of spirapril.
