= David Cushman =

American biochemist (1939–2000)

David Cushman (November 15, 1939 – August 14, 2000) was an American biochemist who co-invented captopril, the first of the (angiotensin-converting enzyme) ACE inhibitors used in the treatment of cardiovascular disease. With Miguel A. Ondetti, Dr. Cushman won the 1999 Lasker Award for: "developing an innovative approach to drug design based on protein structure and using it to create the ACE inhibitors, powerful oral agents for the treatment of high blood pressure, heart failure, and diabetic kidney disease."

== Biography ==
David Cushman was born in Indianapolis, Indiana. He was the son of Wayne B. and Mildred M. and married to Linda L. Kranch. They have two children together named Michael and Laura Cushman. In high school, Dr. Cushman didn't have a drive or reason to succeed academically until he found a class he enjoyed because of the teacher. He went on to Wabash College in Crawfordsville, Indiana where he majored in Zoology and minored in Chemistry. His tenacious attitude gave him the boost to get magna cum laude. He was a first-generation college student in his family and grew up poor. He also stated that growing up poor is what made him strive for better, stating "being poor is a great stimulus for wanting to achieve something."

After earning his Ph.D. in 1966 from the University of Illinois, Dr. Cushman joined the Squibb Institute for Medical Research. His and Dr. Ondetti's research began with the Brazilian pit viper, one of the world's deadliest snakes. A peptide in the venom inhibits angiotensin-converting enzyme (ACE), which helps regulate blood pressure. At first the idea of this drug was controversial and many believed that the drug would be ineffective. There were multiple instances when people told them to quit. Despite that, Dr. Cushman, and Dr. Ondetti paid no attention to them and continued their research. Dr. Cushman even considered Zola Horovitz as a hero for his support.

Dr. Cushman said captopril's significance from a basic research point of view is that it was developed through pure chemical design. He credits Dr. John Vane with suggesting angiotensin converting enzyme as a target for research at The Squibb Institute. As Dr. Ondetti put it in an interview, "Capoten really was the first example of rational drug design based on a hypothetical biological mechanism." Dr. Cushman and Dr. Ondetti were not expecting as much publicity from discovering captopril or the importance of the drug that it had in cardiovascular therapy. Captopril became available to the public in 1982 after FDA approval. Two side effects reported were hypotension or rashes in some patients when "very high doses of the drug" were given. It was stated that captopril is "an oral drug that significantly reduces hypertension in more than eighty percent of users and has no side effects on the central or autonomic nervous systems." Captopril became the drug to achieve a first billion dollar in sales for Squibb.

Cushman died on August 14, 2000, at the age of 60.
