= Miguel Ondetti =

American biochemist (1930–2004)

Miguel Angel Ondetti
- Born: June 14, 1930; Buenos Aires, Argentina
- Died: August 23, 2004 (aged 74)
- Education: University of Buenos Aires
- Known for: Captopril
- Awards: Perkin Medal (1991); Lasker-DeBakey Clinical Medical Research Award (1999)
- Scientific career
- Fields: Chemistry
- Workplaces: Squibb
- Doctoral advisor: Venancio Deulofeu

Miguel Angel Ondetti (May 14, 1930 – August 23, 2004) was an Argentine-born American chemist who first synthesized captopril, the first ACE inhibitor that was used to treat heart disease. With his co-worker, David Cushman, he won the 1999 Lasker Award, with David Cushman, for: "developing an innovative approach to drug design based on protein structure and using it to create the ACE inhibitors, powerful oral agents for the treatment of high blood pressure, heart failure, and diabetic kidney disease".

Ondetti was born and raised in Buenos Aires and received a PhD in chemistry from the University of Buenos Aires, in his hometown, in 1957. In 1960 he moved to The Squibb Institute for Medical Research in New Jersey where he researched and developed Captopril in 1975.

== Early life ==
Miguel A. Ondetti was born in Buenos Aires, Argentina; on May 23, 1930. Ondetti's background was Italian. His mother was an Argentine-born Italian, while his father's family had first emigrated from Italy to Paris, then to Argentina. Despite this, Ondetti considered himself a "first-generation Argentine". Ondetti's father practiced a family craft of making garden furniture from cement that imitated tree trunks. Following the mid-1930s he became a night watchman. His mother was a housewife who cared for Miguel and his only brother, who is two years older. Ondetti's first experience with chemistry was experimenting with his older brother. Miguel tried to electroplate a knife using a copper sulfate solution, only to shock himself.

== Education ==
Both Ondetti brothers went to a vocational high school to study bookkeeping and accounting. At the age of 16, Miguel Ondetti worked a day job while conducting his studies at night. Ondetti stated, "But then, I was already interested in being scientist, I think probably from the year that I started high school" in his 1995 interview. His interest in chemistry stems from book borrowing from the public library.

After graduating commercial high school, Ondetti experienced a major setback. The University of Buenos Aires denied admission because he did not receive a baccalaureate from an academic high school. Not discouraged, Ondetti audited his classes and received his baccalaureate in just two years. The University of Buenos Aires subsequently accepted him to their chemistry program.

Ondetti supported himself during his university years by working as a bookkeeper, using his first high school degree. He managed to get an early shift at the Department of Energy. This allowed him to attend the required laboratory classes in the afternoon. Ondetti's experience with chemistry laboratory was unfamiliar to his previous knowledge in bookkeeping, but was not off-putting.

Ondetti stated that his main interest was biology, "but one can't understand biology without chemistry". He used this for his motivation to studying chemistry. This philosophy has been strongly utilized in the past 30 years, long after Ondetti stated this fact.

Ondetti studied chemistry in the early 1950s. The program at University of Buenos Aires was similar to a combined BA/MS program in American education. He spent five years learning organic, physical, inorganic, biological and analytical chemistry. This was standard at the time, with the transition to a more focused program occurring during Ondetti's 4th year, making Ondetti one of the last recipients of the generalized degree. The rationale behind the very broad program was that chemists needed to be prepared for all types of industries such as paint, petrochemical or the pharmaceutical industry.

At the end of Ondetti's five years, he received a Licentiate in 1955. In the 1950s, Argentina experienced political turmoil and slow economic growth. Many university professors moved to industry jobs, including the head of organic chemistry at the University of Buenos Aires, Dr. Venancio Deulofeu. Ondetti accepted a research training scholarship offered by Squibb following the suggestion from a classmate.

== Early career ==
=== The Squibb Institute for Medical Research, Argentina ===
The Argentine government gave an exclusive license to Squibb to manufacture antibiotics in the country. To supplement the fermentation plant, Squibb constructed The Squibb Institute for Medical Research. This presented an opportunity for Ondetti, allowing him to work in one of the most advanced labs in Argentina with world-class scientists such as Dr. Deulofeu and Dr. Alfredo Sordelli. Another quirk about the Squibb laboratory was that Ondetti was not an official employee because he was a scholarship-research scientist, enabling him to focus on his thesis.

Dr. Deulofeu was the head of chemistry at Squibb and his interests included alkaloid and carbohydrate chemistry. Ondetti reluctantly worked on carbohydrates for one year, after which Deulofeu offered him a job at Squibb. He refused, citing "I turned it down, because Deulofeu was an outstanding scientist, but he was very cold in the interaction with his collaborators". Realizing his mistake after one week of work at another company, he went back to Squibb and received a position there, resuming work on this thesis in 1957. Ondetti received his PhD from the University of Buenos Aires in 1960.

As an employee as Squibb, Ondetti focused on alkaloid chemistry. Argentina's rich biodiversity allowed Squibb to screen many plants for unique and useful alkaloids. Any potential drug candidates were tested at The Squibb Research Institute in New Brunswick, New Jersey.

The Squibb Research Institute in New Jersey was headed by Asger F. Langlykke who visited the Argentine lab once a year. In 1960, he offered Ondetti a job to work in the New Jersey laboratory. Within two days, Ondetti decided to take the job in New Jersey for $7800 a year.

=== The Squibb Institute for Medical Research, New Jersey ===
Ondetti had multiple obstacles to overcome to work in the US. Primarily, most of Ondetti's English experience had been from chemistry textbooks. Surprisingly, Ondetti's largest language barrier was not Spanish to English, but adjusting from British to American English. Fortunately, he found an English tutor in America. Overall, Ondetti enjoyed his move to America, citing the ease of finding a car and an apartment as examples.

The research which Ondetti worked on was also improved. Instead of sending samples to the United States from Argentina, he brought them down the hall. Ondetti was placed in the peptide synthesis research group. As opposed to his initial reaction to carbohydrate chemistry, he was pleased because he enjoyed contact with biologists. Over the next nine years, Ondetti gained recognition in peptide synthesis and the position as peptide chemistry chair. After this promotion, Miguel and his wife, Josephine, definitely decided to stay in America after considering the possibility of moving back during the original move.

During the 1960s, peptides were considered valuable drug candidates. Ondetti's group researched synthesis of insulin and venom peptides. In the mid 1960s, the director created a task force to work on peptides. In this rearrangement, Ondetti came to work with Emily Sabo. During Squibb's effort to synthesis secretin, Ondetti stopped carrying a lab notebook. He considered Sabo to be such an accurate and skilled chemist, that he let her do all the experiments. By the end of the 1960s, peptides were phased out as drug candidates.

Miguel Ondetti moved to the gastrointestinal hormone group in the mid 1960s. The first hormone to be studied by Ondetti's group was cholecystokinin, a digestion hormone. This product presented unique challenges because of the small amounts used in reactions. Unfortunately, bioassays were not quantitative enough to use for results and chemical reactions did not run well as such low amounts.

=== Development of Captopril ===
In 1967, the company changed its goals with a new president of The Squibb Institute, Arnold D. Welch. Cardiovascular drugs became an area of concentration. Ondetti gained inspiration from his previous work on peptides. Peptides are vital in-vivo components, but peptides are cleaved by peptidases, decreasing their utility as drugs. By inhibiting these peptidases, one could increase activity of peptide drugs.

Ondetti started work on the isolation of angiotensin-converting enzyme inhibitors. By 1973, work on ACE inhibitors stopped followed by dissolution of the peptide program. In 1974, Ondetti resumed unofficial work on ACE inhibitors with strong resolve, "We said this was the thing that we had to do". The first step in making Captopril was determining the characteristics of the enzyme, discovered by comparing it to another enzyme, Carboxypeptidase A. His group tried thousands of compounds from the Squibb library, but none yielded satisfying results.

After reading literature involving the peptides by Byers and Wolfenden, Ondetti pointed out flaws in their logic. He argued that using a strong chemical binder to the zinc in the enzyme would increase activity. He settled on using a sulfhydryl group which binds strongly to zinc. Ondetti had discovered Captopril, an ACE inhibitor with much better activity than previous compounds.

Ondetti published his primary paper on his synthesis in Science, 1977. The first human trials were done in Switzerland because European drug testing regulations were less strict. Captopril reached the American market in 1982. Captopril gained much commercial success for Squibb. It was also one of the first successful heart medicine and set a long tradition for them.

== Later career ==
Ondetti enjoyed success with his synthesis of Captopril. He remained active in research, gaining patents in 1985, 1992, and 1993. Squibb recognized his leadership skills and he received numerous promotions at Squibb. After his Captopril discovery, he was promoted to vice president of Basic Research. In the next ten years, Ondetti assumed more leadership roles in the cardiovascular and metabolic research department, culminating in his promotion to senior vice president of cardiovascular and metabolic in 1990.

Ondetti retired the next year in 1991. At this time he lived in Princeton, New Jersey. In 1991, Ondetti was awarded the prestigious Perkin Medal. Ondetti was interviewed by James J. Bohning of the Chemical Heritage Foundation in 1995 for The Oral History Program at the Chemical Heritage Foundation.

Miguel A. Ondetti died on August 23, 2004.

== Publications ==
- Ondetti M A, Sabo E F. Angiotensin-converting enzyme inhibitors from the venom of Bothrops jararaca. Isolation, elucidation of structure, and synthesis, Biochemistry 1971; 10 (22): 4033–4039.
- Ondetti M A, Rubin B, Cushman D W. Design of specific inhibitors of angiotensin-converting enzyme: new class of orally active antihypertensive agents, Science 1977; 196 (4288): 441–444.

== Patents ==
- U.S. patent 3,740,385 "N-Terminal Derivatives of Secretin", filed May 1970, issued June 1973
- U.S. patent 4,199,512 "Compounds for alleviating hypertension", filed September 1978, issued April 1980
- U.S. patent 4,154,935 "Halogen substituted mercaptoacylamino acids", filed September 1978, issued May 1978
- U.S. patent 4,241,076 "Halogenated substituted mercaptoacylamino acids", filed May 1979, issued December 1980
- U.S. patent 4,339,600 "Compounds for alleviating angiotensin related hypertension", filed February 1978, issued July 1982
- U.S. patent 4,722,810 "Enkephalinase inhibitors", filed August 1986, issued February 1988

== Honors and awards ==
- Alfred Burger Award in Medicinal Chemistry, American Chemical Society, 1981
- Thomas Alva Edison Patent Award, Research and Development Council, New Jersey, 1983
- Ciba Award for Hypertension Research, American Heart Association, Council on High Blood Pressure Research, 1983
- Chairman's Edward Robinson Squibb Award, E. R. Squibb & Sons, Inc., 1986
- Award for Contributions to Medical Science, Pharmaceutical Manufacturers Association and National Health Council, 1988
- Inventor of the Year Award, New Jersey Inventors Congress, 1988
- Perkin Medal, Society of Chemical Industry, American Section, 1991
- Warren Alpert Foundation Prize, Harvard Medical School, 1991
- Award for Creative Invention, American Chemical Society, 1992
- Herman Bloch Award for Scientific Excellence in Industry, University of Chicago, 1992
- Lasker-DeBakey Clinical Medical Research Award, 1999
