= Alacepril =

Antihypertensive drug of the ACE inhibitor class

Clinical data
- AHFS/Drugs.com: International Drug Names
- Routes of administration: Oral
- ATC code: none

Legal status
- Legal status: In general: ℞ (Prescription only)

Identifiers
- IUPAC name: (2S)-2-[[(2S)-1-[(2S)-3-acetylsulfanyl-2-methylpropanoyl]pyrrolidine-2-carbonyl]amino]-3-phenylpropanoic acid
- CAS Number: 74258-86-9
- PubChem CID: 71992
- ChemSpider: 64993
- UNII: X39TL7JDPF
- KEGG: D01900
- ChEMBL: ChEMBL2103775
- CompTox Dashboard (EPA): DTXSID3048576

Chemical and physical data
- Formula: C_{20}H_{26}N_{2}O_{5}S
- Molar mass: 406.50 g·mol^{−1}
- 3D model (JSmol): Interactive image
- SMILES: C[C@H](CSC(=O)C)C(=O)N1CCC[C@H]1C(=O)N[C@@H](CC2=CC=CC=C2)C(=O)O
- InChI: InChI=1S/C20H26N2O5S/c1-13(12-28-14(2)23)19(25)22-10-6-9-17(22)18(24)21-16(20(26)27)11-15-7-4-3-5-8-15/h3-5,7-8,13,16-17H,6,9-12H2,1-2H3,(H,21,24)(H,26,27)/t13-,16+,17+/m1/s1; Key:FHHHOYXPRDYHEZ-COXVUDFISA-N

Alacepril (INN) is an ACE inhibitor medication indicated as a treatment for hypertension. The medication metabolizes to captopril and desacetylalacepril. Alacepril is primarily used to treat hypertension, and in some cases, renovascular hypertension. It's often combined with other medications, particularly other blood pressure lowering classes of medications like thiazide diuretics to maximize its effectiveness.

== Mechanism of action ==
In vivo, when alacepril undergoes deacetylation, it loses a molecule similar to the amino acid phenylalanine which transforms it into captopril. Captopril then provides its blood pressure lowering effect through two ways. First, it inhibits the conversion of angiotensin 1, a precursor molecule, to angiotensin II, a vasoconstrictor that narrows blood vessels. Secondly, captopril prevents the breakdown of bradykinin, a vasodilator peptide that naturally relaxes blood vessels.

== Synthesis ==
Thieme ChemDrug Synthesis: Patents: ~65%:

Amide formation between S-Acetylcaptopril [64838-55-7] (1) and (S)-tert-Butyl 2-amino-3-phenylpropanoate [16874-17-2] (2) gives PC86595505 (3). Deprotection with trifluoroacetic acid completed the synthesis of alacepril (4).
