= Teprotide =

Names
- IUPAC name 5-oxo-L-prolyl-L-tryptophyl-L-prolyl-N^{5}-(diaminomethylidene)-L-ornithyl-L-prolyl-L-glutaminyl-L-isoleucyl-L-prolyl-L-proline

Identifiers
CAS Number	35115-60-7
3D model (JSmol)	Interactive image
ChEMBL	ChEMBL408983
ChemSpider	391608
PubChem CID	443376
UNII	C3E5QBF1R6
CompTox Dashboard (EPA)	DTXSID301029698
- InChI: InChI=1S/C53H76N14O12/c1-3-29(2)43(51(77)66-25-9-16-39(66)50(76)67-26-10-17-40(67)52(78)79)63-45(71)34(18-20-41(54)68)60-46(72)37-14-7-23-64(37)48(74)35(13-6-22-57-53(55)56)61-47(73)38-15-8-24-65(38)49(75)36(62-44(70)33-19-21-42(69)59-33)27-30-28-58-32-12-5-4-11-31(30)32/h4-5,11-12,28-29,33-40,43,58H,3,6-10,13-27H2,1-2H3,(H2,54,68)(H,59,69)(H,60,72)(H,61,73)(H,62,70)(H,63,71)(H,78,79)(H4,55,56,57)/t29-,33-,34-,35-,36-,37-,38-,39-,40-,43-/m0/s1 Key: UUUHXMGGBIUAPW-CSCXCSGISA-N; InChI=1S/C53H76N14O12/c1-3-29(2)43(51(77)66-25-9-16-39(66)50(76)67-26-10-17-40(67)52(78)79)63-45(71)34(18-20-41(54)68)60-46(72)37-14-7-23-64(37)48(74)35(13-6-22-57-53(55)56)61-47(73)38-15-8-24-65(38)49(75)36(62-44(70)33-19-21-42(69)59-33)27-30-28-58-32-12-5-4-11-31(30)32/h4-5,11-12,28-29,33-40,43,58H,3,6-10,13-27H2,1-2H3,(H2,54,68)(H,59,69)(H,60,72)(H,61,73)(H,62,70)(H,63,71)(H,78,79)(H4,55,56,57)/t29-,33-,34-,35-,36-,37-,38-,39-,40-,43-/m0/s1
- SMILES: O=C(O)[C@H]7N(C(=O)[C@H]6N(C(=O)[C@@H](NC(=O)[C@@H](NC(=O)[C@H]5N(C(=O)[C@@H](NC(=O)[C@H]4N(C(=O)[C@@H](NC(=O)[C@H]1NC(=O)CC1)Cc3c2ccccc2[nH]c3)CCC4)CCC/N=C(\N)N)CCC5)CCC(=O)N)[C@@H](C)CC)CCC6)CCC7

Properties
Chemical formula	C_{53}H_{76}N_{14}O_{12}
Molar mass	1101.257
- Except where otherwise noted, data are given for materials in their standard state (at 25 °C [77 °F], 100 kPa). verify (what is ?) Infobox references

Teprotide is nonapeptide which has been isolated from the snake Bothrops jararaca. It is an angiotensin converting enzyme inhibitor (ACE inhibitor) which inhibits the conversion of angiotensin I to angiotensin II and may potentiate some of the pharmacological actions of bradykinin. It has been investigated as an antihypertension agent.

== Isolation and synthesis ==
The antihypertensive effects of teprotide were first observed by Sergio Ferreira in 1965 and it was first isolated by Ferreira et al. along with eight other peptides in 1970. Teprotide was synthesized in 1970 by Ondetti et al. and from there its antihypertensive properties were studied more closely.

== Medical use ==
Teprotide was chosen as a lead because of its long-lasting in vivo activity. This was demonstrated by Bianchi et al. by administering teprotide to dogs and rats and observing that it inhibited the vasopressor response induced by angiotensin I. Teprotide was shown to be an effective antihyperension agent but it had limited use because of its expense and lack of oral activity. It was found that teprotide inhibits the enzyme that converts angiotensin I to angiotensin II. From this researchers conducted structure-activity studies which allowed them to identify the active binding site of the ACE which allowed for the development of antihypertension drugs to be developed. Captopril was the first antihypertension drug developed by Ondetti and Cushman. Many ACE inhibitors have been developed since this time but this was the start of them.
