= Tasosartan =

Chemical compound

Clinical data
- Pregnancy category: N/A
- ATC code: C09CA05 (WHO)

Legal status
- Legal status: Withdrawn

Identifiers
- IUPAC name: 2,4-dimethyl-8-{[2'-(1H-tetrazol-5-yl)biphenyl-4-yl]methyl}-5,8-dihydropyrido[2,3-d]pyrimidin-7(6H)-one
- CAS Number: 145733-36-4
- PubChem CID: 60919
- IUPHAR/BPS: 6898
- DrugBank: DB01349
- ChemSpider: 54890
- UNII: 48G92V856H
- CompTox Dashboard (EPA): DTXSID40163148

Chemical and physical data
- Formula: C_{23}H_{21}N_{7}O
- Molar mass: 411.469 g·mol^{−1}

Tasosartan is an angiotensin II receptor antagonist.

It was withdrawn from FDA review by the manufacturer after phase III clinical trials showed elevated transaminases (a sign of possible liver toxicity) in a significant number of participants given the drug.
