= Lactotripeptides =

- IPP

- VPP

Names
- IUPAC names IPP: (2S)-1-[(2S)-1-[(2S,3S)-2-Amino-3-methylpentanoyl]pyrrolidine-2-carbonyl]pyrrolidine-2-carboxylic acid VPP: (2S)-1-[(2S)-1-[(2S)-2-Amino-3-methylbutanoyl]pyrrolidine-2-carbonyl]pyrrolidine-2-carboxylic acid
- Other names IPP: H-Ile-Pro-Pro-OH; VPP: H-Val-Pro-Pro-OH

Identifiers
CAS Number	IPP: 26001-32-1; VPP: 58872-39-2
3D model (JSmol)	IPP: Interactive image; VPP: Interactive image
PubChem CID	IPP: 9949212; VPP: 9818200
UNII	VPP: 2U1R84870F
- SMILES: IPP: CC[C@H](C)[C@@H](C(=O)N1CCC[C@H]1C(=O)N2CCC[C@H]2C(=O)O)N; VPP: CC(C)[C@@H](C(=O)N1CCC[C@H]1C(=O)N2CCC[C@H]2C(=O)O)N

Properties
Chemical formula	IPP: C_{16}H_{27}N_{3}O_{4} VPP: C_{15}H_{25}N_{3}O_{4}
- Except where otherwise noted, data are given for materials in their standard state (at 25 °C [77 °F], 100 kPa). Infobox references

Lactotripeptides are two naturally occurring milk peptides: isoleucine-proline-proline (IPP) and valine-proline-proline (VPP). These lactotripeptides are derived from casein, which is a milk protein also found in dairy products. Although most normal dairy products contain lactotripeptides, they are inactive within the original milk proteins. Dairy peptides can be effectively released through enzymatic predigestion – a process by which milk protein is enzymatically broken down into smaller pieces. Some clinical studies have suggested that these lactotripeptides help promote healthy blood pressure levels as part of a healthy diet and lifestyle. However, other clinical trials have seen no effects from these compounds.

== Proposed mechanism ==
Dairy peptides are proposed to inhibit the activity of angiotensin-converting enzyme (ACE). ACE is part of the renin–angiotensin system – a natural mechanism that helps regulate blood pressure in the body. In certain individuals, the renin–angiotensin system can become overactive, often due to stress, an unhealthy diet, and/or unhealthy lifestyle. Under such conditions, ACE becomes overactive and converts more angiotensin I into angiotensin II. Angiotensin II causes blood vessels to constrict, and so increases blood pressure, which has potential to lead to hypertension. But, when ACE activity is inhibited, the formation of angiotensin II is reduced. This then helps the blood vessels to relax and expand back to a normal healthy state, so blood pressure is lowered.

== Clinical trials ==
Several human trials aimed to evaluate the effect of lactotripeptides on blood pressure. Some trials show a blood pressure-lowering effect of lactotripeptides in people with mild to moderate hypertension, however others see no effect from these peptides. A recent systematic review of the literature found no confirmed ACE-inhibitor effects in humans, as well as no conclusive evidence for lactotripeptides as a successful intervention; the meta-analysis cited heterogeneity in methodology and lack of inclusion of recent larger studies by prior meta-analyses to account for the variance between studies.
