= Trandolapril =

Antihypertensive drug of the ACE inhibitor class

Clinical data
- Trade names: Mavik, others
- AHFS/Drugs.com: Monograph
- MedlinePlus: a697010
- Routes of administration: By mouth
- ATC code: C09AA10 (WHO)

Legal status
- Legal status: In general: ℞ (Prescription only)

Pharmacokinetic data
- Protein binding: Trandolapril 80% (independent of concentration); Trandolaprilat 65 to 94% (concentration-dependent)
- Metabolism: Liver
- Elimination half-life: 6 hours (trandolapril); 10 hours (trandolaprilat)
- Excretion: Fecal and Kidney

Identifiers
- IUPAC name: (2S,3aR,7aS)-1-[(2S)-2-{[(2S)-1-ethoxy-1-oxo-4-phenylbutan-2-yl]amino}propanoyl]-octahydro-1H-indole-2-carboxylic acid
- CAS Number: 87679-37-6
- PubChem CID: 5484727
- IUPHAR/BPS: 6453
- DrugBank: DB00519
- ChemSpider: 4588590
- UNII: 1T0N3G9CRC
- KEGG: D00383
- ChEBI: CHEBI:9649
- ChEMBL: ChEMBL1519
- CompTox Dashboard (EPA): DTXSID2023692
- ECHA InfoCard: 100.108.532

Chemical and physical data
- Formula: C_{24}H_{34}N_{2}O_{5}
- Molar mass: 430.545 g·mol^{−1}
- 3D model (JSmol): Interactive image
- Melting point: 119 to 123 °C (246 to 253 °F)
- SMILES: O=C(OCC)[C@@H](N[C@H](C(=O)N1[C@H](C(=O)O)C[C@H]2CCCC[C@H]12)C)CCc3ccccc3
- InChI: InChI=1S/C24H34N2O5/c1-3-31-24(30)19(14-13-17-9-5-4-6-10-17)25-16(2)22(27)26-20-12-8-7-11-18(20)15-21(26)23(28)29/h4-6,9-10,16,18-21,25H,3,7-8,11-15H2,1-2H3,(H,28,29)/t16-,18+,19-,20-,21-/m0/s1; Key:VXFJYXUZANRPDJ-WTNASJBWSA-N

Trandolapril is an ACE inhibitor used to treat high blood pressure. It may also be used to treat other conditions. It is similar in structure to another ramipril but has a cyclohexane group. It is a prodrug that must be metabolized into its active form. It has a longer half-life when compared to other agents in this class.

It was patented in 1981 and approved for medical use in 1993. It is marketed by Abbott Laboratories under the brand name Mavik.

== Side effects ==
Side effects reported for trandolapril include nausea, vomiting, diarrhea, headache, dry cough, dizziness or lightheadedness when sitting up or standing, hypotension, or fatigue.

== Possible drug interactions ==
Patients also on diuretics may experience an excessive reduction of blood pressure after initiation of therapy with trandolapril. It can reduce potassium loss caused by thiazide diuretics and increase serum potassium when used alone. Therefore, hyperkalemia is a possible risk. Increased serum lithium levels can occur in patients who are also on lithium.

== Pregnancy and lactation ==
Trandolapril is teratogenic (US: pregnancy category D) and can cause birth defects and even death of the developing fetus. The highest risk to the fetus is during the second and third trimesters. When pregnancy is detected, trandolapril should be discontinued as soon as possible. Trandolapril should not be administered to nursing mothers.

== Additional effects ==
Combination therapy with paricalcitol and trandolapril has been found to reduce fibrosis in obstructive uropathy.

== Pharmacology ==
Trandolaprilat — the active metabolite of trandolapril

Trandolapril is a prodrug that is deesterified to trandolaprilat. It is believed to exert its antihypertensive effect through the renin–angiotensin–aldosterone system. Trandolapril has a half-life of about six hours, while trandolaprilat has a half life of about ten hours. Trandolaprilat has about eight times the activity of its parent drug. About one-third of trandolapril and its metabolites are excreted in the urine, and about two-thirds of trandolapril and its metabolites are excreted in the feces. Serum protein binding of trandolapril is about 80%.

== Mode of action ==
Trandolapril acts by competitive inhibition of angiotensin converting enzyme (ACE), a key enzyme in the renin–angiotensin system. which plays an important role in regulating blood pressure.
