= Ramipril =

ACE inhibitor medication

Clinical data
- Trade names: Altace, others
- AHFS/Drugs.com: Monograph
- MedlinePlus: a692027
- License data: US DailyMed: Ramipril
- Routes of administration: By mouth
- ATC code: C09AA05 (WHO)

Legal status
- Legal status: CA: ℞-only; UK: POM (Prescription only); US: ℞-only

Pharmacokinetic data
- Bioavailability: 28%
- Protein binding: 73% (ramipril); 56% (ramiprilat)
- Metabolism: Liver, to ramiprilat
- Elimination half-life: 13 to 17 hours
- Excretion: Kidney (60%) and fecal (40%)

Identifiers
- IUPAC name: (2S,3aS,6aS)-1-[(2S)-2-[[(2S)-1-Ethoxy-1-oxo-4-phenylbutan-2-yl]amino]propanoyl]-3,3a,4,5,6,6a-hexahydro-2H-cyclopenta[b]pyrrole-2-carboxylic acid
- CAS Number: 87333-19-5
- PubChem CID: 5362129
- IUPHAR/BPS: 6339
- DrugBank: DB00178
- ChemSpider: 4514937
- UNII: L35JN3I7SJ
- KEGG: D00421
- ChEBI: CHEBI:8774
- ChEMBL: ChEMBL1168
- CompTox Dashboard (EPA): DTXSID8023551
- ECHA InfoCard: 100.170.726

Chemical and physical data
- Formula: C_{23}H_{32}N_{2}O_{5}
- Molar mass: 416.518 g·mol^{−1}
- 3D model (JSmol): Interactive image
- Melting point: 109 °C (228 °F)
- SMILES: O=C(OCC)[C@@H](N[C@H](C(=O)N1[C@H](C(=O)O)C[C@@H]2CCC[C@H]12)C)CCc3ccccc3
- InChI: InChI=1S/C23H32N2O5/c1-3-30-23(29)18(13-12-16-8-5-4-6-9-16)24-15(2)21(26)25-19-11-7-10-17(19)14-20(25)22(27)28/h4-6,8-9,15,17-20,24H,3,7,10-14H2,1-2H3,(H,27,28)/t15-,17-,18-,19-,20-/m0/s1; Key:HDACQVRGBOVJII-JBDAPHQKSA-N

Ramipril, sold under the brand name Altace among others, is an ACE inhibitor type medication taken by mouth used to treat high blood pressure, heart failure, and diabetic kidney disease. It can also be used as a preventative medication in patients over 55 years old to reduce the risk of having a heart attack, stroke or cardiovascular death in patients shown to be at high risk, such as some diabetics and patients with vascular disease. It is a reasonable initial treatment for high blood pressure.

Common side effects include headaches, dizziness, fatigue, and cough. Serious side effects may include liver problems, angioedema, kidney problems, and high blood potassium. Use in pregnancy and breastfeeding is not recommended. It is an ACE inhibitor and works by decreasing renin-angiotensin-aldosterone system activity.

Ramipril was patented in 1981 and approved for medical use in 1989. It is available as a generic medication. In 2023, it was the 211th most commonly prescribed medication in the United States, with more than 2 million prescriptions.

== Activation and binding ==
Ramipril is a pro-drug. The molecule must be hydrolyzed by an esterase at the OCH_{2}CH_{3} and form a carboxylate. This carboxylate then interacts with the positive Zn^{2+} ion which is located at the active site of the ACE enzyme. Ramipril is similar in structure to another ACE Inhibitor, trandolapril, but it has a second cyclopentane ring instead of a cyclohexane ring.

== Medical uses ==
Medical uses include:

- High blood pressure (Hypertension)
- Congestive heart failure
- Following heart attack in people with evidence of heart failure
- People over 55 years at high risk: prevention of heart attack, stroke, cardiovascular death, or in need of revascularization procedures
- Prevent the onset and/or delay the progression of diabetic kidney disease, with or without proteinuria. Randomized trial evidence suggests that a maximum tolerable dose prevents cardiovascular events and death in patients with diabetic kidney disease.

== Contraindications ==
Contraindications to its use include volume-depleted patients, a history of angioedema while on an ACE inhibitor, pregnancy and hypotension.

People should not take ramipril (or any ACE inhibitors) if they have hyperkalemia. It is also recommended to avoid using salt-substitutes as this can further increase potassium levels in the blood.

Ramipril can be considered in patients with bilateral or unilateral significant renal artery stenosis (RAS). An early rise in serum creatinine above baseline is expected after initiation of therapy with Ramipril, however, monitoring serum biochemistry and renal function after initiation is crucial. Treatment with Ramipril in some patients with significant narrowing in both kidneys can increase serum creatinine concentration (measured in the blood test), which returns to baseline upon therapy cessation.

== Adverse effects ==
- Shakiness
- Dry cough
- Dizziness and lightheadedness due to low blood pressure
- Fatigue, especially in the early stages
- Mouth dryness in the early stages
- Nausea
- Fainting
- Signs of infection (e.g., fever, chills, persistent sore throat)
- Chest pain
- Neutropenia (low white blood cells)
- Impotence (erectile dysfunction)
- Hyperkalemia

Serious allergic reactions to this drug are unlikely, but immediate medical attention must be sought if they occur. Symptoms of a serious allergic reaction include, but are not limited to a rash or swelling of the face, mouth, tongue, or throat. In extreme cases, ramipril may lead to potentially fatal liver problems.

== Mechanism of action ==
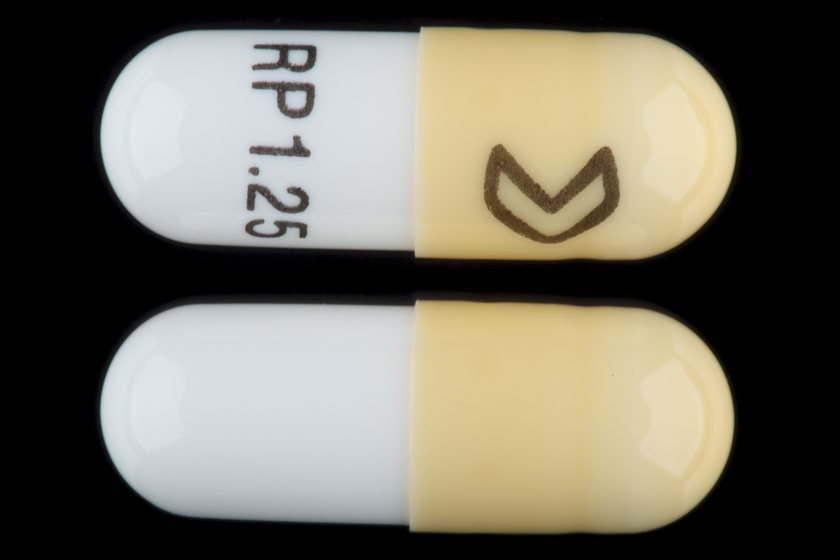
Ramipril 1.25-mg oral capsule, letter codes and icons may differ

ACE inhibitors inhibit the actions of angiotensin converting enzyme (ACE), thereby lowering the production of angiotensin II and decreasing the breakdown of bradykinin. The decrease in angiotensin II results in relaxation of arteriole smooth muscle leading to a decrease in total peripheral resistance, reducing blood pressure as the blood is pumped through widened vessels. Its effect on bradykinin is responsible for the dry cough side effect.

Ramipril, a prodrug or precursor drug, is converted to the active metabolite ramiprilat by carboxylesterase 1. Ramiprilat is mostly excreted by the kidneys. Its half-life is variable (3–16 hours), and is prolonged by heart and liver failure, as well as kidney failure. Peak effect occurs between 3 and 6 hours after dosing, with approximately 50% of this effect retained after 24 hours.

== Synthesis ==
The penultimate step in the synthesis of ramipril combines an alanine derivative with a (S,S,S)-2-azabicyclo-[3.3.0]-octane-3-carboxylic acid protected as its benzyl ester. In the original patented route, these components were obtained by a multi-step process.

The acid chloride forms an amide bond with the amino group of the pyrrolidine ring in the presence of triethylamine and ramipril is the product after the benzyl ester has been removed by hydrogenation.

== Society and culture ==
=== US patent ===
The compound was protected by a patent which was assigned to the German pharmaceutical company Hoechst AG (since merged into Aventis) on 29 October 1991. The patent was scheduled to expire on 29 October 2008. On 11 September 2007, in an appeal by the Indian company Lupin Ltd., the United States Court of Appeals for the Federal Circuit reversed a district court trial verdict and found that Aventis's patent on ramipril was invalid for "obviousness", opening this drug to generic manufacturers.

=== Brand names ===
Brand names for Ramipril
Brand Name	Country/Region	Marketer/Manufacturer
Altace	Canada	Sanofi
Altace	United States	King Pharmaceuticals
Ampril	Slovenia	Krka
Cardace	India	
Corpril	Hungary	Cemelog-BRS
Endpril	Myanmar	
Novapril	Ghana	Pharmanova
Odipril	India	
Piramil	Serbia	Hemofarm
Prilace	Australia	Arrow Pharmaceuticals
Prilinda	Serbia	Hemofarm
Ramace	Bangladesh	Novartis, Opsonin Pharma Limited
Ramipro	Philippines	Westfield Pharma
Ramipril	Canada	Pharmascience
Ramipril	Israel	Teva
Ramipril	Poland	Lek
Ramistar	India	
Ramitens		PharmaSwiss
Triatec	Italy	Sanofi
Triatec	United States	Sanofi
Tritace	Israel	Sanofi
Tritace	UK	Sanofi
Zigpril	India	
Zorem	India	

== Research ==
The 2001 Heart Outcomes and Prevention Evaluation trial seemed to show ramipril possessed cardioprotective qualities which extended beyond its qualities as an antihypertensive. However, the trial and the interpretation of its results have been criticised.

The Acute Infarction Ramipril Efficacy (AIRE) trial showed a 27% reduction in mortality for patients receiving ramipril for chronic heart failure following a myocardial infarction.

Ramipril was found to have similar results as telmisartan, an angiotensin II receptor blocker.
