= Fosinopril =

Antihypertensive drug of the ACE inhibitor class

Clinical data
- Trade names: Monopril
- AHFS/Drugs.com: Monograph
- MedlinePlus: a692020
- Pregnancy category: AU: D
- Routes of administration: By mouth
- ATC code: C09AA09 (WHO)

Legal status
- Legal status: In general: ℞ (Prescription only)

Pharmacokinetic data
- Bioavailability: ~36%
- Protein binding: 87% (fosinoprilat)
- Metabolism: liver, GIT mucosa (to fosinoprilat)
- Elimination half-life: 12 hours (fosinoprilat)
- Excretion: kidney

Identifiers
- IUPAC name: (2S,4S)-4-cyclohexyl-1-[2-[hydroxy(4-phenylbutyl)phosphoryl]acetyl]pyrrolidine-2-carboxylic acid
- CAS Number: 98048-97-6
- PubChem CID: 55891
- IUPHAR/BPS: 6456
- DrugBank: DB00492
- ChemSpider: 10482016
- UNII: R43D2573WO
- KEGG: D07992
- ChEMBL: ChEMBL3039598
- CompTox Dashboard (EPA): DTXSID1023079

Chemical and physical data
- Formula: C_{30}H_{46}NO_{7}P
- Molar mass: 563.672 g·mol^{−1}
- 3D model (JSmol): Interactive image
- SMILES: O=C(CP(=O)(CCCCc1ccccc1)OC(OC(=O)CC)C(C)C)N2C[C@@H](C[C@H]2C(O)=O)C3CCCCC3
- InChI: InChI=1S/C30H46NO7P/c1-4-28(33)37-30(22(2)3)38-39(36,18-12-11-15-23-13-7-5-8-14-23)21-27(32)31-20-25(19-26(31)29(34)35)24-16-9-6-10-17-24/h5,7-8,13-14,22,24-26,30H,4,6,9-12,15-21H2,1-3H3,(H,34,35)/t25-,26+,30?,39-/m1/s1; Key:BIDNLKIUORFRQP-YYTCENNOSA-N

Fosinopril is an angiotensin converting enzyme (ACE) inhibitor used for the treatment of hypertension and some types of chronic heart failure. Fosinopril is the only phosphonate-containing ACE inhibitor marketed, by Bristol-Myers Squibb under the trade name Monopril. Fosinopril is a cascading pro-drug. The special niche for the medication that differentiates it from the other members of the ACE Inhibitor drug class is that was specifically developed for the use for patients with renal impairment. This was through manipulation of the metabolism and excretion, and is seen that fifty percent of the drug is hepatobiliary cleared, which can compensate for diminished renal clearance. The remaining fifty percent is excreted in urine. It does not need dose adjustment.

It was patented in 1980 and approved for medical use in 1991.

== Medical uses ==
In congestive heart failure, the ability of the heart to pump enough blood to satisfy the physiological needs of the body is reduced. This condition has a variety of causes, including damaged heart valves, myocardial infarction, hypertension, vitamin B_{1} deficiency, and genetic mutations. When subsequent blood flow to the kidneys is reduced, the kidneys respond by increasing the secretion of renin from the juxtaglomerular apparatus. Renin converts the inactive angiotensinogen into angiotensin I, which is converted to angiotensin II (AII) by angiotensin converting enzyme (ACE). AII can have negative effects on the cardiovascular system after events such as heart failure and myocardial infarction. AII causes arterial vasoconstriction and hypertension, resulting in an increase in afterload, increasing the resistance against which the heart works. Additionally, chronic increase in production of AII is associated with structural changes to the myocardium which reduces the functionality of the heart.

In heart failure patients, fosinopril increases exercise tolerance and lowers the frequency of events associated with worsening heart failure, such as dyspnea, the need for supplemental diuretics, fatigue, and hospitalizations.

== Chemistry ==
Unlike other ACE inhibitors that are primarily excreted by the kidneys, fosinopril is eliminated from the body by both renal and hepatic pathways. This characteristic of fosinopril makes the drug a safer choice than other ACE inhibitors for heart failure patients with impaired kidney function resulting from poor perfusion as fosinopril can still be eliminated by the liver, preventing accumulation of the drug in the body.

Fosinopril is de-esterified by the liver or gastrointestinal mucosa and is converted to its active form, fosinoprilat. Fosinoprilat competitively binds to ACE, preventing ACE from binding to and converting angiotensin I to angiotensin II. Inhibiting the production of AII lowers peripheral vascular resistance, decreases afterload, and decreases blood pressure, thus helping to alleviate the negative effects of AII on cardiac performance.
