= ATC code C09 =

Pharmaceutical drug classification

ATC code C09 Agents acting on the renin–angiotensin system is a therapeutic subgroup of the Anatomical Therapeutic Chemical Classification System, a system of alphanumeric codes developed by the World Health Organization (WHO) for the classification of drugs and other medical products. Subgroup C09 is part of the anatomical group C Cardiovascular system.

Codes for veterinary use (ATCvet codes) can be created by placing the letter Q in front of the human ATC code: for example, QC09.
National versions of the ATC classification may include additional codes not present in this list, which follows the WHO version.

== C09A ACE inhibitors, plain ==
=== C09AA ACE inhibitors, plain ===
C09AA01 Captopril
C09AA02 Enalapril
C09AA03 Lisinopril
C09AA04 Perindopril
C09AA05 Ramipril
C09AA06 Quinapril
C09AA07 Benazepril
C09AA08 Cilazapril
C09AA09 Fosinopril
C09AA10 Trandolapril
C09AA11 Spirapril
C09AA12 Delapril
C09AA13 Moexipril
C09AA14 Temocapril
C09AA15 Zofenopril
C09AA16 Imidapril

== C09B ACE inhibitors, combinations ==
=== C09BA ACE inhibitors and diuretics ===
C09BA01 Captopril and diuretics
C09BA02 Enalapril and diuretics
C09BA03 Lisinopril and diuretics
C09BA04 Perindopril and diuretics
C09BA05 Ramipril and diuretics
C09BA06 Quinapril and diuretics
C09BA07 Benazepril and diuretics
C09BA08 Cilazapril and diuretics
C09BA09 Fosinopril and diuretics
C09BA12 Delapril and diuretics
C09BA13 Moexipril and diuretics
C09BA15 Zofenopril and diuretics

=== C09BB ACE inhibitors and calcium channel blockers ===
C09BB02 Enalapril and lercanidipine
C09BB03 Lisinopril and amlodipine
C09BB04 Perindopril and amlodipine
C09BB05 Ramipril and felodipine
C09BB06 Enalapril and nitrendipine
C09BB07 Ramipril and amlodipine
C09BB10 Trandolapril and verapamil
C09BB12 Delapril and manidipine
C09BB13 Benazepril and amlodipine
C09BB14 Zofenopril and amlodipine

=== C09BX ACE inhibitors, other combinations ===
C09BX01 Perindopril, amlodipine and indapamide
C09BX02 Perindopril and bisoprolol
C09BX03 Ramipril, amlodipine and hydrochlorothiazide
C09BX04 Perindopril, bisoprolol and amlodipine
C09BX05 Ramipril and bisoprolol
C09BX06 Perindopril, bisoprolol, amlodipine and indapamide
C09BX07 Zofenopril and nebivolol
QC09BX90 Benazepril and pimobendan

== C09C Angiotensin II receptor blockers (ARBs), plain ==
=== C09CA Angiotensin II receptor blockers (ARBs), plain ===
C09CA01 Losartan
C09CA02 Eprosartan
C09CA03 Valsartan
C09CA04 Irbesartan
C09CA05 Tasosartan
C09CA06 Candesartan
C09CA07 Telmisartan
C09CA08 Olmesartan medoxomil
C09CA09 Azilsartan medoxomil
C09CA10 Fimasartan

== C09D Angiotensin II receptor blockers (ARBs), combinations ==
=== C09DA Angiotensin II receptor blockers (ARBs) and diuretics ===
C09DA01 Losartan and diuretics
C09DA02 Eprosartan and diuretics
C09DA03 Valsartan and diuretics
C09DA04 Irbesartan and diuretics
C09DA06 Candesartan and diuretics
C09DA07 Telmisartan and diuretics
C09DA08 Olmesartan medoxomil and diuretics
C09DA09 Azilsartan medoxomil and diuretics
C09DA10 Fimasartan and diuretics

=== C09DB Angiotensin II receptor blockers (ARBs) and calcium channel blockers ===
C09DB01 Valsartan and amlodipine
C09DB02 Olmesartan medoxomil and amlodipine
C09DB04 Telmisartan and amlodipine
C09DB05 Irbesartan and amlodipine
C09DB06 Losartan and amlodipine
C09DB07 Candesartan and amlodipine
C09DB08 Valsartan and lercanidipine
C09DB09 Fimasartan and amlodipine

=== C09DX Angiotensin II receptor blockers (ARBs), other combinations ===
C09DX01 Valsartan, amlodipine and hydrochlorothiazide
C09DX02 Valsartan and aliskiren
C09DX03 Olmesartan medoxomil, amlodipine and hydrochlorothiazide
C09DX04 Valsartan and sacubitril
C09DX05 Valsartan and nebivolol
C09DX06 Candesartan, amlodipine and hydrochlorothiazide
C09DX07 Irbesartan, amlodipine and hydrochlorothiazide
C09DX08 Telmisartan, amlodipine and hydrochlorothiazide
C09DX09 Candesartan, amlodipine and indapamide

== C09X Other agents acting on the renin–angiotensin system ==
=== C09XA Renin-inhibitors ===
C09XA01 Remikiren
C09XA02 Aliskiren
C09XA52 Aliskiren and hydrochlorothiazide
C09XA53 Aliskiren and amlodipine
C09XA54 Aliskiren, amlodipine and hydrochlorothiazide

=== C09XX Other agents acting on the renin-angiotensin system ===
C09XX01 Sparsentan
