= ACE inhibitor =

Class of medications used primarily to treat high blood pressure

Angiotensin-converting-enzyme inhibitor
- Drug class
- Captopril, the first synthetic ACE inhibitor

Class identifiers
- Use: Hypertension
- ATC code: C09A
- Biological target: Angiotensin-converting enzyme

Clinical data
- Drugs.com: Drug Classes
- Consumer Reports: Best Buy Drugs
- WebMD: MedicineNet RxList

External links
- MeSH: D000806

Legal status

Angiotensin-converting-enzyme inhibitors (ACE inhibitors) are a class of medication used primarily for the treatment of cardiovascular and kidney diseases. This class of medicine works by causing relaxation of blood vessels as well as a decrease in blood volume, which leads to lower blood pressure and decreased oxygen demand from the heart.

ACE inhibitors inhibit the activity of angiotensin-converting enzyme, an important component of the renin–angiotensin system which converts angiotensin I to angiotensin II, and hydrolyzes bradykinin. Therefore, ACE inhibitors decrease the formation of angiotensin II, a vasoconstrictor, and increase the level of bradykinin, a peptide vasodilator. This combination is synergistic in lowering blood pressure.

As a result of inhibiting the ACE enzyme in the bradykinin system, the ACE inhibitor drugs allow for increased levels of bradykinin which would normally be degraded. Bradykinin produces prostaglandin. This mechanism can explain the two most common side effects seen with ACE Inhibitors: angioedema and cough.

Frequently prescribed ACE inhibitors include benazepril, zofenopril, perindopril, trandolapril, captopril, enalapril, lisinopril, and ramipril.

== Medical uses ==
ACE inhibitors were initially approved for the treatment of hypertension and can be used alone or in combination with other anti-hypertensive medications. Later, they were found useful for other cardiovascular and kidney diseases including:

- Acute myocardial infarction (heart attack)
- Heart failure (left ventricular systolic dysfunction)
- Kidney complications of diabetes mellitus (diabetic nephropathy) by means of decreasing the blood pressure and preventing glomerular hyperfiltration injury

In treating high blood pressure, ACE inhibitors are a first-line drug choice. Age, frailty, and race can influence treatment choices and it is common to need more than one drug to obtain the desired improvement.

All ACE inhibitors but enalapril, which can be given intravenously, are administered orally. Each one has different strengths with different starting dosages. Dosage should be adjusted according to the clinical response. Most ACE inhibitors can be dosed once daily with the exception of captopril. ACE inhibitors possess many common characteristics with another class of cardiovascular drugs, angiotensin II receptor antagonists, which are often used when patients are intolerant of the adverse effects produced by ACE inhibitors. ACE inhibitors do not completely prevent the formation of angiotensin II, as blockage is dose-dependent, so angiotensin II receptor antagonists may be useful because they act to prevent the action of angiotensin II at the AT_{1} receptor, leaving AT_{2} receptor unblocked; the latter may have consequences needing further study. There are fixed-dose combination drugs, such as ACE inhibitor and thiazide combinations.

ACE inhibitors have also been used in chronic kidney failure and kidney involvement in systemic sclerosis (hardening of tissues, as scleroderma renal crisis). In those with stable coronary artery disease, but no heart failure, benefits are similar to other usual treatments.

In 2012, a meta-analysis published in the BMJ described the protective role of ACE inhibitors in reducing the risk of pneumonia when compared to angiotensin II receptor blocker (ARBs). The authors found a decreased risk in patients with previous stroke (54% risk reduction), with heart failure (37% risk reduction), and of Asian descent (43% risk reduction vs 54% risk reduction in non-Asian population). However, no reduced pneumonia-related mortality was observed.

ACE inhibitors have been shown to be effective for indications other than hypertension even in patients with normal blood pressure. The use of a maximum dose of ACE inhibitors in such patients (including for prevention of diabetic nephropathy, congestive heart failure, and prophylaxis of cardiovascular events) is justified, because it improves clinical outcomes independently of the blood pressure-lowering effect of ACE inhibitors. Such therapy, of course, requires careful and gradual titration of the dose to prevent the effects of rapidly decreasing blood pressure (dizziness, fainting, etc.).

ACE inhibitors may also be used to help decrease excessive water consumption in people with schizophrenia resulting in psychogenic polydipsia. A double-blind, placebo-controlled trial showed that when used for this purpose, enalapril led to decreased consumption (determined by urine output and osmolality) in 60% of people; the same effect has been demonstrated in other ACE inhibitors.

Use of ACE inhibitors in kidney transplant patients may have little to no benefits.

=== Specific populations ===
==== Pregnancy ====
In pregnant women, ACE inhibitors taken during all the trimesters have been reported to cause congenital malformations, stillbirths, and neonatal deaths. Commonly reported fetal abnormalities include hypotension, renal dysplasia, anuria/oliguria, oligohydramnios, intrauterine growth retardation, pulmonary hypoplasia, patent ductus arteriosus, and incomplete ossification of the skull. Overall, about half of newborns exposed to ACE inhibitors are adversely affected, leading to birth defects.

ACE inhibitors are ADEC pregnancy category D and should be avoided in women who are likely to become pregnant. In the U.S., ACE inhibitors must be labeled with a boxed warning concerning the risk of birth defects when taken during the second and third trimester. Their use in the first trimester is also associated with a risk of major congenital malformations, particularly affecting the cardiovascular and central nervous systems.

=== Breastfeeding ===
ACE inhibitors may be used with caution during breastfeeding due to evidence showing small amounts being present in breastmilk. Enalapril is most commonly prescribed and has the most data published. The medications are considered safe for the mother.

=== In children ===
Common ACE inhibitors used in pediatrics for hypertension include captopril, enalapril, and lisinopril and are used in patients older than six years old.

=== In the elderly ===
ACE inhibitors are strongly advised not to be started in elderly patients presenting with dehydration. Potassium and creatinine must be monitored during course of treatment.

== Contraindications ==
The ACE inhibitors are contraindicated in people with:

- Pregnancy
- Previous angioedema associated with ACE inhibitor therapy
- Bilateral renal artery stenosis
- Hypersensitivity to ACE inhibitors
- Impaired renal function
- Aortic valve stenosis or cardiac outflow obstruction
- Dehydration (hypovalemia)

ACE inhibitors should be used with caution in people with hemodialysis with high-flux polyacrylonitrile membranes.

== Interactions ==
A combination of ACE inhibitor with other drugs may increase effects of these drugs, but also the risk of adverse effects. Commonly reported adverse effects of drug combination with ACE inhibitor are acute renal failure, hypotension, and hyperkalemia. Drugs interacting with ACE inhibitor should be prescribed with caution. Special attention should be given to combinations of ACE inhibitor with diuretics (especially potassium-sparing diuretics), NSAIDs, anticoagulants, cyclosporine, DPP-4 inhibitors, and potassium supplements

Angiotensin II receptor antagonists (ARBs) should not be used with ACE inhibitors. Dual RAAS inhibitor therapy (ACE inhbitors, ARBs, direct renin inhibitors, or mineralocorticoid receptor antagonists) has been found to significantly increase the risk of developing kidney damage and hyperkalemia.

Potassium supplementation should be used with caution and under medical supervision owing to the hyperkalemic effect of ACE inhibitors.

Concomitant use with cyclooxygenase inhibitors tends to decrease ACE inhibitor's hypotensive effect.

== Adverse effects ==
Common side effects include low blood pressure, cough, hyperkalemia, headache, dizziness, fatigue, nausea, and kidney impairment.

The main adverse effects of ACE inhibition can be understood from their pharmacological action. The other reported adverse effects are liver problems and effects on the fetus. Kidney problems may occur with all ACE inhibitors that directly follows from their mechanism of action. However, the decrease may be significant in conditions of pre-existing decreased renal perfusions, such as renal artery stenosis, heart failure, polycystic kidney disease, or volume depletion. In these patients, the maintenance of GFR depends on angiotensin-II-dependent efferent vasomotor tone. Therefore, renal function should be closely monitored over the first few days after initiation of treatment with ACE inhibitor in patients with decreased renal perfusion. Generally, a moderate reduction in renal function (no greater than 30% rise in serum creatinine which stabilizes within 2–4 weeks) is considered acceptable as part of the therapeutic effect.

Reduced GFR is especially a problem if the patient is concomitantly taking an NSAID and a diuretic. When the three drugs are taken together, the risk of developing renal failure is significantly increased.

Hyperkalemia, or high blood potassium, is a common adverse effect of treatment in 2% to 6% of patients. Suppression of angiotensin II leads to a decrease in aldosterone levels. Since aldosterone is responsible for increasing the excretion of potassium, ACE inhibitors can cause retention of potassium. Some people, however, can continue to lose potassium while on an ACE inhibitor. Hyperkalemia may decrease the velocity of impulse conduction in the nerves and muscles, including cardiac tissues. This leads to cardiac dysfunction and neuromuscular consequences, such as muscle weakness, paresthesia, nausea, diarrhea, and others. Close monitoring of potassium levels is required in patients receiving treatment with ACE inhibitors who are at risk of hyperkalemia.

Another possible adverse effect specific for ACE inhibitors, but not for other RAAS blockers, is an increase in bradykinin level. Additional research on this topic is required.

A persistent dry cough is a common adverse effect produced by ACE inhibitors in 10% to 20% of patients. People who experience coughing are often switched to angiotensin II receptor antagonists.

Between 0.1% and 0.7% of patients develop angioedema or swelling. A genetic predisposition may exist.

=== Blood ===
Hematologic effects, such as neutropenia, agranulocytosis and other blood dyscrasias, have occurred during therapy with ACE inhibitors, especially in people with additional risk factors.

== Overdose ==
There are few reports of ACE inhibitor overdose, toxicity is more likely with the addition of other hypotensive drugs or higher than recommended doses. The most likely manifestations are hypotension, which may be severe, hyperkalemia, hyponatremia and renal impairment with metabolic acidosis. Related symptoms of hypotension are treated with naloxone. Treatment should be mainly symptomatic and supportive, with volume expansion using normal saline to correct hypotension and improve renal function, and gastric lavage followed by activated charcoal and a cathartic to prevent further absorption of the drug. Captopril, enalapril, lisinopril and perindopril are known to be removable by hemodialysis.

== Pharmacology ==
=== Mechanism of action ===
ACE inhibitors reduce the activity of the renin–angiotensin–aldosterone system (RAAS) as the primary etiologic (causal) event in the development of hypertension in people with diabetes mellitus, as part of the insulin-resistance syndrome or as a manifestation of renal disease.

=== Renin–angiotensin–aldosterone system ===
Renin–angiotensin–aldosterone system

The renin–angiotensin–aldosterone system is a major blood pressure regulating mechanism. Markers of electrolyte and water imbalance in the body such as hypotension, low distal tubule sodium concentration, decreased blood volume and high sympathetic tone trigger the release of the enzyme renin from the cells of juxtaglomerular apparatus in the kidney.

Renin activates a circulating liver derived prohormone angiotensinogen by proteolytic cleavage of all but its first ten amino acid residues known as angiotensin I. ACE (angiotensin converting enzyme) then removes a further two residues, converting angiotensin I into angiotensin II. ACE is found in the pulmonary circulation and in the endothelium of many blood vessels. The system increases blood pressure by increasing the amount of salt and water the body retains. Angiotensin II is also a potent vasoconstrictor.

=== Effects ===
ACE inhibitors block the conversion of angiotensin I (ATI) to angiotensin II (ATII). Arteriolar resistance is lowered, venous capacity is increased; cardiac output, cardiac index, stroke work, and volume is lowered; resistance in renal blood vessels is lowered; and lead to increased natriuresis (excretion of sodium in the urine). Bradykinin levels increase because angiotensin-converting enzyme also degrades bradykinin, and its inhibition reduces bradykinin inactivation.

Under normal conditions, angiotensin II has these effects:

- Vasoconstriction (narrowing of blood vessels) and vascular smooth muscle hypertrophy (enlargement) induced by ATII may lead to increased blood pressure and hypertension. Further, constriction of the efferent arterioles of the kidney leads to increased perfusion pressure in the glomeruli.
- It contributes to ventricular remodeling and ventricular hypertrophy of the heart through stimulation of the proto-oncogenes c-fos, c-jun, c-myc, transforming growth factor beta (TGF-B), through fibrogenesis and apoptosis (programmed cell death).
- Stimulation by ATII of the adrenal cortex to release aldosterone, a hormone that acts on kidney tubules, causes sodium and chloride ions retention and potassium excretion. Sodium is a "water-holding" ion, so water is also retained, which leads to increased blood volume, hence an increase in blood pressure.
- Stimulation of the posterior pituitary to release vasopressin (antidiuretic hormone, ADH) also acts on the kidneys to increase water retention. If ADH production is excessive in heart failure, Na^{+} level in the plasma may fall (hyponatremia), and this is a sign of increased risk of death in heart failure patients.
- A decrease renal protein kinase C

During the course of ACE inhibitor use, the production of ATII is decreased, (Note: ACE inhibitors don't appear to permanently reduce ATII plasma level after cessation of taking it. In short, ACE inhibitors don't cure high ATII plasma levels.) which prevents aldosterone release from the adrenal cortex. This allows the kidney to excrete sodium ions along with water, and retain potassium ions. This decreases blood volume, leading to decreased blood pressure.

Epidemiological and clinical studies have shown ACE inhibitors reduce the progress of diabetic nephropathy independently from their blood pressure-lowering effect. This action of ACE inhibitors is used in the prevention of diabetic renal failure.

ACE inhibitors have also been shown to cause a central enhancement of parasympathetic nervous system activity in healthy volunteers and patients with heart failure. This action may reduce the prevalence of malignant cardiac arrhythmias, and the reduction in sudden death reported in large clinical trials. ACE Inhibitors also reduce plasma norepinephrine levels, and its resulting vasoconstriction effects, in heart failure patients, thus breaking the vicious circles of sympathetic and renin angiotensin system activation, which sustains the downward spiral in cardiac function in congestive heart failure.

The ACE inhibitor enalapril has also been shown to reduce cardiac cachexia in patients with chronic heart failure. Cachexia is a poor prognostic sign in patients with chronic heart failure. ACE inhibitors are under early investigation for the treatment of frailty and muscle wasting (sarcopenia) in elderly patients without heart failure.

== History ==
ACE in plasma was discovered by Leonard T. Skeggs, Norman Shumway, and their colleagues in 1956, but at that time there was no known physiological basis for its use in heart failure treatment. That changed in 1962, when the physiological rationale for using vasodilators to reduce afterload in heart failure was established by American cardiologist Edmund Sonnenblick through force-velocity studies of isolated cardiac muscle. These studies demonstrated that the resistance against which the ventricle contracts directly determines its performance—providing the theoretical justification for afterload reduction as a therapeutic strategy that ACE inhibitors would later exploit.

Around this time, it was also noted that those who worked in banana plantations in South-western Brazil collapsed after being bitten by a pit viper, leading to a search for a blood pressure lowering component in its venom. Brazilian scientist Sérgio Henrique Ferreira reported a bradykinin-potentiating factor (BPF) present in the venom of Bothrops jararaca, a South American pit viper, in 1965. Ferreira then went to John Vane's laboratory as a postdoctoral fellow with his already-isolated BPF. The conversion of the inactive angiotensin I to the potent angiotensin II was thought to take place in the plasma. However, in 1967, Kevin K. F. Ng and John R. Vane showed plasma ACE is too slow to account for the conversion of angiotensin I to angiotensin II in vivo. Subsequent investigation showed rapid conversion occurs during its passage through the pulmonary circulation.

Bradykinin is rapidly inactivated in the circulating blood, and it disappears completely in a single pass through the pulmonary circulation. Angiotensin I also disappears in the pulmonary circulation because of its conversion to angiotensin II. Furthermore, angiotensin II passes through the lungs without any loss. The inactivation of bradykinin and the conversion of angiotensin I to angiotensin II in the lungs was thought to be caused by the same enzyme. In 1970, Ng and Vane, using BPF provided by Ferreira, showed the conversion is inhibited during its passage through the pulmonary circulation.

BPFs are members of a family of peptides whose potentiating action is linked to inhibition of bradykinin by ACE. Molecular analysis of BPF yielded a nonapeptide BPF teprotide (SQ 20,881), which showed the greatest ACE inhibition potency and hypotensive effect in vivo. Teprotide had limited clinical value as a result of its peptide nature and lack of activity when given orally. In the early 1970s, knowledge of the structure-activity relationship required for inhibition of ACE was growing. David Cushman, Miguel Ondetti and colleagues used peptide analogs to study the structure of ACE, using carboxypeptidase A as a model. Their discoveries led to the development of captopril, the first orally-active ACE inhibitor, in 1975.

Captopril was approved by the United States Food and Drug Administration in 1981. The first nonsulfhydryl-containing ACE inhibitor, enalapril, was approved four years later. At least 8 other ACE inhibitors have since been marketed.

In 1991, Japanese scientists created the first milk-based ACE inhibitor, in the form of a fermented milk drink, using specific cultures to liberate the tripeptide isoleucine-proline-proline (IPP) from the dairy protein. Valine-proline-proline (VPP) is also liberated in this process—another milk tripeptide with a very similar chemical structure to IPP. Together, these peptides are now often referred to as lactotripeptides. In 1996, the first human study confirmed the blood pressure-lowering effect of IPP in fermented milk. Although twice the amount of VPP is needed to achieve the same ACE-inhibiting activity as the originally discovered IPP, VPP also is assumed to add to the total blood pressure lowering effect. Since the first lactotripeptides discovery, more than 20 human clinical trials have been conducted in many different countries.

== Agents ==
Currently, there are 10 ACE inhibitors approved for use in the United States by the FDA: captopril (1981), enalapril (1985), lisinopril (1987), benazepril (1991), fosinopril (1991), quinapril (1991), ramipril (1991), perindopril (1993), moexipril (1995) and trandolapril (1996).

ACE inhibitors are easily identifiable by their common suffix, '-pril'. ACE inhibitors can be divided into three groups based on their molecular structure of the enzyme binding sites (sulfhydryl, phosphinyl, carboxyl) to the active center of ACE:

=== Sulfhydryl-containing agents ===
- Alacepril
- Captopril (trade name Capoten), the first ACE inhibitor.
- Zofenopril

These agents appear to show antioxidative properties but may be involved in adverse events such as skin eruptions.

=== Dicarboxylate-containing agents ===
This is the largest group, including:

- Benazepril (Lotensin)
- Cilazapril (Inhibace)
- Enalapril (Vasotec/Renitec/Berlipril/Enap/Enalapril Profarma)
- Imidapril (Tanatril)
- Lisinopril (Listril/Lopril/Novatec/Prinivil/Zestril, Lisidigal)
- Moexipril (Univasc)
- Perindopril (Coversyl/Aceon/Perindo)
- Quinapril (Accupril)
- Ramipril (Altace/Prilace/Ramace/Ramiwin/Triatec/Tritace/Ramitac)
- Trandolapril (Mavik/Odrik/Gopten)

=== Phosphonate-containing agents ===
- Ceronapril (never marketed)
- Fosinopril (Fositen/Monopril)

=== Naturally occurring ===
ACE inhibitor peptides can be derived from natural sources such as algae, fruit, seeds, dairy and animal products. A comprehensive resource on anti-hypertensive peptides is available in the form of a database. It contains around 1700 unique antihypertensive peptides. Arfalasin (HOE 409) is an angiotensin antagonist.

==== Dairy products ====
Casokinins and lactokinins, breakdown products of casein and whey, occur naturally after ingestion of milk products, especially cultured milk. Their role in blood pressure control is uncertain. The lactotripeptides Val-Pro-Pro and Ile-Pro-Pro produced by the probiotic Lactobacillus helveticus or derived from casein have been shown to have ACE-inhibiting and antihypertensive functions. In one study, L. helveticus PR4 was isolated from Italian cheeses.

== Comparative information ==
All ACE inhibitors have similar antihypertensive efficacy when equivalent doses are administered. The main differences lie with captopril, the first ACE inhibitor. Captopril has a shorter duration of action and an increased incidence of adverse effects. It is also capable of passing through the blood–brain barrier.

In a large clinical study, one of the agents in the ACE inhibitor class, ramipril (Altace), demonstrated an ability to reduce the mortality rates of patients with a myocardial infarction and to slow the subsequent development of heart failure. This finding was made after it was discovered that regular use of ramipril reduced mortality rates even in test subjects who did not have hypertension.

Some believe ramipril's additional benefits may be shared by some or all drugs in the ACE-inhibitor class. However, ramipril currently remains the only ACE inhibitor for which such effects are actually evidence-based.

A meta-analysis confirmed that ACE inhibitors are effective and certainly the first-line choice in hypertension treatment. This meta-analysis was based on 20 trials and a cohort of 158,998 patients, of whom 91% were hypertensive. ACE inhibitors were used as the active treatment in seven trials (n=76,615) and angiotensin receptor blocker (ARB) in 13 trials (n=82,383). ACE inhibitors were associated with a statistically significant 10% mortality reduction: (HR 0.90; 95% CI, 0.84–0.97; P=0.004). In contrast, no significant mortality reduction was observed with ARB treatment (HR 0.99; 95% CI, 0.94–1.04; P=0.683). Analysis of mortality reduction by different ACE inhibitors showed that perindopril-based regimens are associated with a statistically significant 13% all-cause mortality reduction. Taking into account the broad spectrum of the hypertensive population, one might expect that an effective treatment with ACE inhibitors, in particular with perindopril, would result in an important gain of lives saved.

== See also ==
- Angiotensin II receptor blocker
  - Discovery and development of angiotensin receptor blockers
- Loop diuretic, also used to treat CHF
- Renin inhibitor
