= Renin inhibitor =

Compound inhibiting the activity of renin

- Drug class
- Aliskiren, the first renin inhibitor to be marketed

Class identifiers
- Use: Hypertension
- ATC code: C09XA
- Biological target: Renin

Clinical data
- Drugs.com: Drug Classes

Legal status

Renin inhibitors are pharmaceutical drugs inhibiting the activity of renin that is responsible for hydrolyzing angiotensinogen to angiotensin I, which in turn reduces the formation of angiotensin II that facilitates blood pressure.

Renin inhibitor is often preceded by direct, called direct renin inhibitor in order to distinguish its mechanism from other renin–angiotensin–aldosterone system-interfering drugs such as angiotensin converting enzyme inhibitors (ACEIs), angiotensin receptor blockers (ARBs) and aldosterone receptor antagonists.

These drugs inhibit the first and rate-limiting step of the renin–angiotensin–aldosterone system (RAAS), namely the conversion of angiotensinogen to angiotensin I. This leads to a totality in absence of angiotensin II based on the rationale that renin only acts to inhibit this step unlike Angiotensin Converting Enzyme which is also involved in other biochemical reactions. Since the 1970s, scientists have been trying to develop potent inhibitors with acceptable oral bioavailability. The process was difficult and took about three decades. The first and second generations faced problems such as poor bioavailability and lack of potency. Finally, the third generation was discovered. These compounds were nonpeptidic renin inhibitors, had acceptable oral bioavailability and were potent enough for clinical use. The first drug in this class was aliskiren, which received a marketing approval in 2007. As of June 2020, it is the only renin inhibitor on the market.

== History ==
In 1896, the Finnish physiologist Robert Tigerstedt and the Swedish physician Per Bergman did an experiment on kidneys and the circulatory system in rabbits. They observed that blood pressure rose in the rabbits when extracts of the kidneys were injected into their jugular veins. They also discovered this substance responsible for higher blood pressure was produced in the renal cortex, and they named it renin. Although this experiment laid the foundation for future investigations into the RAAS pathway, it had little impact on the scientific community at that time. In 1934, when Goldblatt published his work in renal ischaemia, renin came into focus again. The importance of renin in the pathogenesis of cardiovascular disease was, however, not fully understood until in the 1970s, and 20 years later the first renin inhibitors went to clinical trials.

Pepstatin, which was described in 1972, was the first synthetic renin inhibitor, but poor pharmacokinetic properties prevented it from entering in vivo investigations. The first generation of renin inhibitors, such as H-142, were peptide analogues of angiotensinogen. However, these inhibitors had also limited drug-like properties. Hopes of breakthrough appeared in 1982 when development of the second generation renin inhibitors began. This generation consisted of peptide-like compounds, such as remikiren, enalkiren and zanikiren. They had more drug-like rather than substrate-like properties, and in 1990 they went to clinical trials. The second generation had its limitations and never completed clinical trials.

Aliskiren, the only renin inhibitor to go into phase III clinical trials, is not structurally related to peptides, which makes it a third-generation renin inhibitor. The first clinical trial was performed in 2000 in healthy volunteers. In 2007, aliskiren was approved by the US Food and Drug Administration and the European Medicines Agency as a treatment for hypertension. A systematic review by the Cochrane Hypertension group found the maximum recommended dose of aliskiren produced an appreciable decline in blood pressure over placebo.

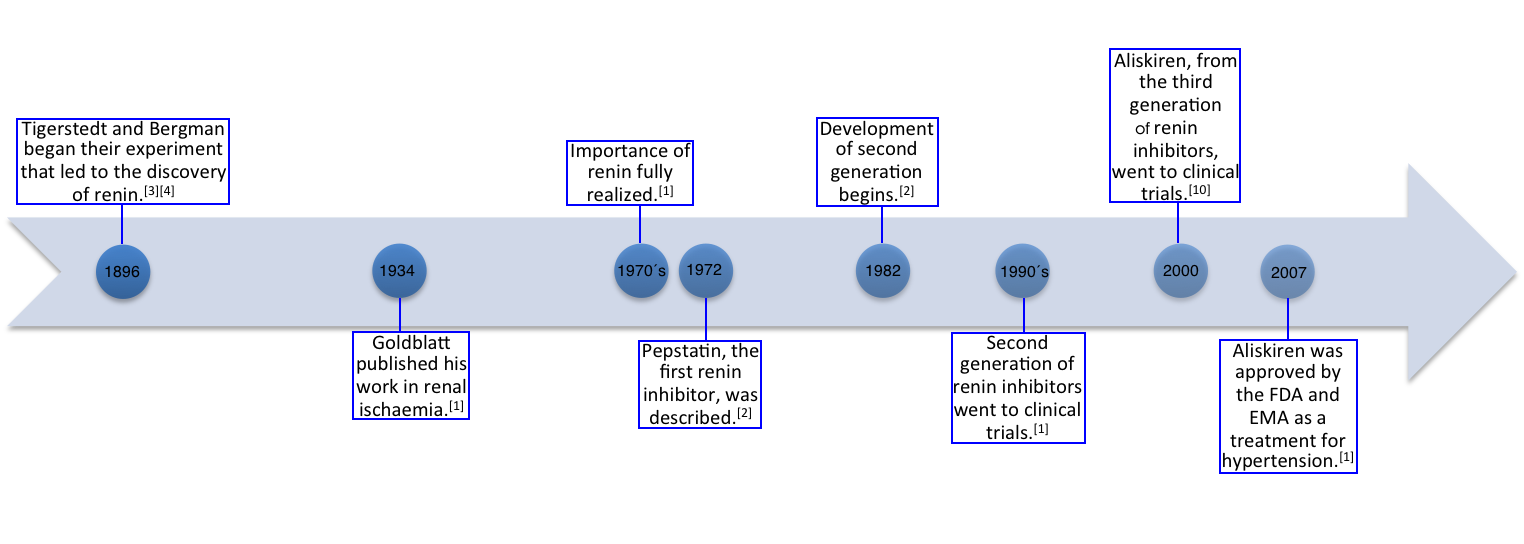
Timeline: Discovery and development of renin inhibitors

== The renin–angiotensin–aldosterone system ==
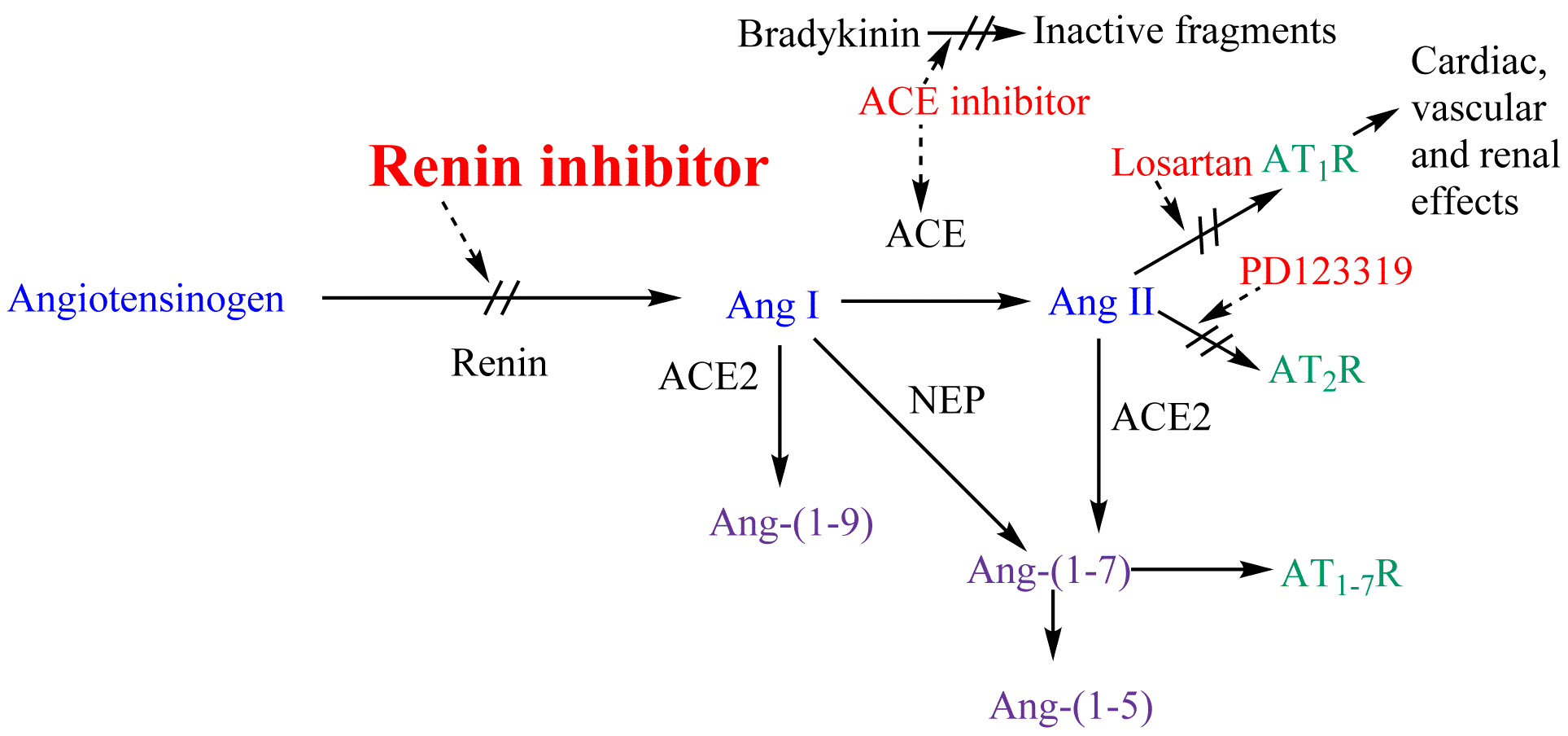
Renin–angiotensin–aldosterone system and potential steps of blockage

The renin–angiotensin–aldosterone system (RAAS) plays a key role in the pathology of cardiovascular disease, hypertension, diabetic kidney disease and heart failure. Under normal conditions, stimulation of the RAAS occurs in response to threats that compromise blood pressure stability, such as hypotension, blood loss and excessive loss of sodium and water. Blood pressure depends on total peripheral resistance and cardiac output.

The highly selective aspartic protease renin is secreted from the juxtaglomerular apparatus, which is the only source of active renin, although its precursor, prorenin, can be secreted by other tissues, such as the salivary glands, brain, heart and blood vessels. Renin is a circulating enzyme that acts on a circulating peptide, angiotensinogen. Renin cleaves the peptide at the Leu10–Val11 bond, and this reaction is the rate-determining step of the RAAS. This leads to the product angiotensin I (Ang I) which is a decapeptide. Ang I is broken down by the angiotensin-converting enzyme (ACE) to the active octapeptide angiotensin II (Ang II), which is the principal effector of the RAAS. Ang II stimulates renal sodium retention; promotes aldosterone secretion; causes vasoconstriction, and increases sympathetic nervous system activity. Ang II also provides a negative feedback to the system by inhibiting renin release by the juxtaglomerular apparatus. Ang II interacts with at least two classes of Ang II receptors, AT1 and AT2. This mechanism, which runs from renin through Ang II and to aldosterone, as well as the negative feedback that Ang II has on renin secretion, is known as RAAS. The net effect is to increase blood pressure, which in normal physiology is necessary in order to maintain homeostasis.

It is suspected that essential hypertension, a heterogeneous disorder whose long-term effects can be end organ damage, can involve at least in some cases an overactivity of this system, which several types of medications attempt to counter. Renin concentration in blood plasma tends to be higher in younger people with hypertension when vasoconstriction may be the main reason for high blood pressure. Conversely, renin is lower in older people or in people of African American or African Caribbean ethnicity when salt retention may contribute more to elevated blood pressure. However, the role of plasma renin levels in the etiology and management of hypertension is disputed.

== Mechanism of action ==
Renin inhibitors bind to the active site of renin and inhibit the binding of renin to angiotensinogen, which is the rate-determining step of the RAAS cascade. Consequently, renin inhibitors prevent the formation of Ang I and Ang II. Renin inhibitors may also prevent Ang-(1-7), Ang-(1-9) and Ang-(1-5) formation, although it is not known if this is clinically important. Renin is highly selective for its only naturally occurring substrate which is angiotensinogen, and the incidence of unwanted side effects with a renin inhibitor is infrequent. and similar to angiotensin II receptor antagonists. Ang II also functions within the RAAS as a negative feedback to suppress further release of renin. A reduction in Ang II levels or blockade of angiotensin receptors will suppress the feedback loop and lead to increased plasma renin concentrations (PRC) and plasma renin activity (PRA). This can be problematic for ACE inhibitor and angiotensin II receptor antagonist therapy since increased PRA could partially overcome the pharmacologic inhibition of the RAAS cascade. Because renin inhibitors directly affect renin activity, decrease of PRA despite the increased PRC (from loss of the negative feedback) may be clinically advantageous.

== Drug discovery and development ==
=== Pepstatin – the first renin inhibitor ===
Pepstatin was the first synthetic renin inhibitor. It is of microbial origin and is an N-acyl-pentapeptide, more accurately: isovaleryl-L-valyl-L-valyl-statyl-L-alanyl-statine. Pepstatin was found to be a potent competitive inhibitor of most aspartic proteases, but a weak inhibitor of renin. Originally, it was thought to be effective in the treatment of duodenal ulcers, and went through clinical trials, but had no success. Statine, an amino acid, is thought to be responsible for the inhibitory activity of pepstatin, because it mimics the tetrahedral transition state of the peptide catalysis. Because of hydrophobic properties of statine, pepstatin has very low solubility in physiological media. Since it had low potency and poor solubility, it did not enter in vivo studies.

=== First generation: peptide analogues ===
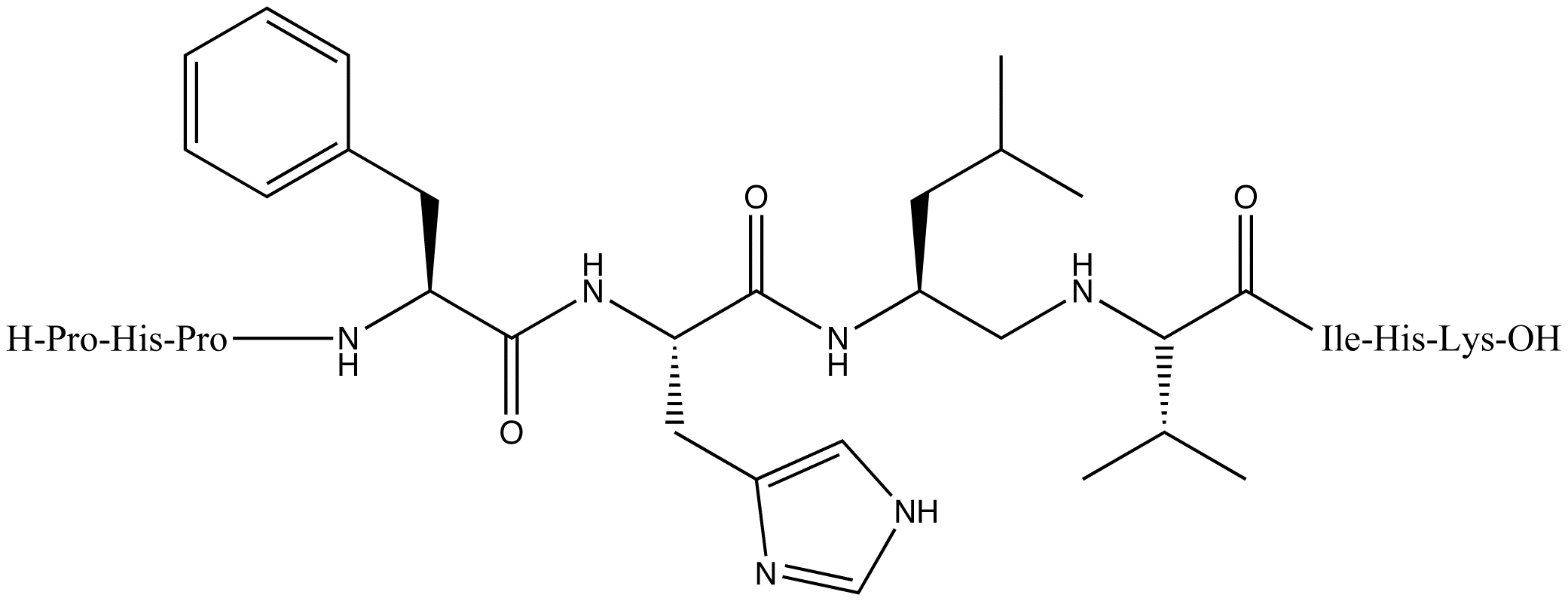
H-142

This generation consists of two groups of compounds, either peptide analogues of the prosegment of renin or peptide analogues of the amino-terminal part of the substrate angiotensinogen. The drugs in the latter group seemed to be effective in inhibiting renin activity and lowering blood pressure in both animals and humans. Unfortunately, they had to be given parenterally because of poor bioavailability. They also turned out to have short durations of action, low potencies and their ability to lower blood pressure was inadequate. None of these drugs completed clinical investigations.

=== Second generation: peptide mimetics ===
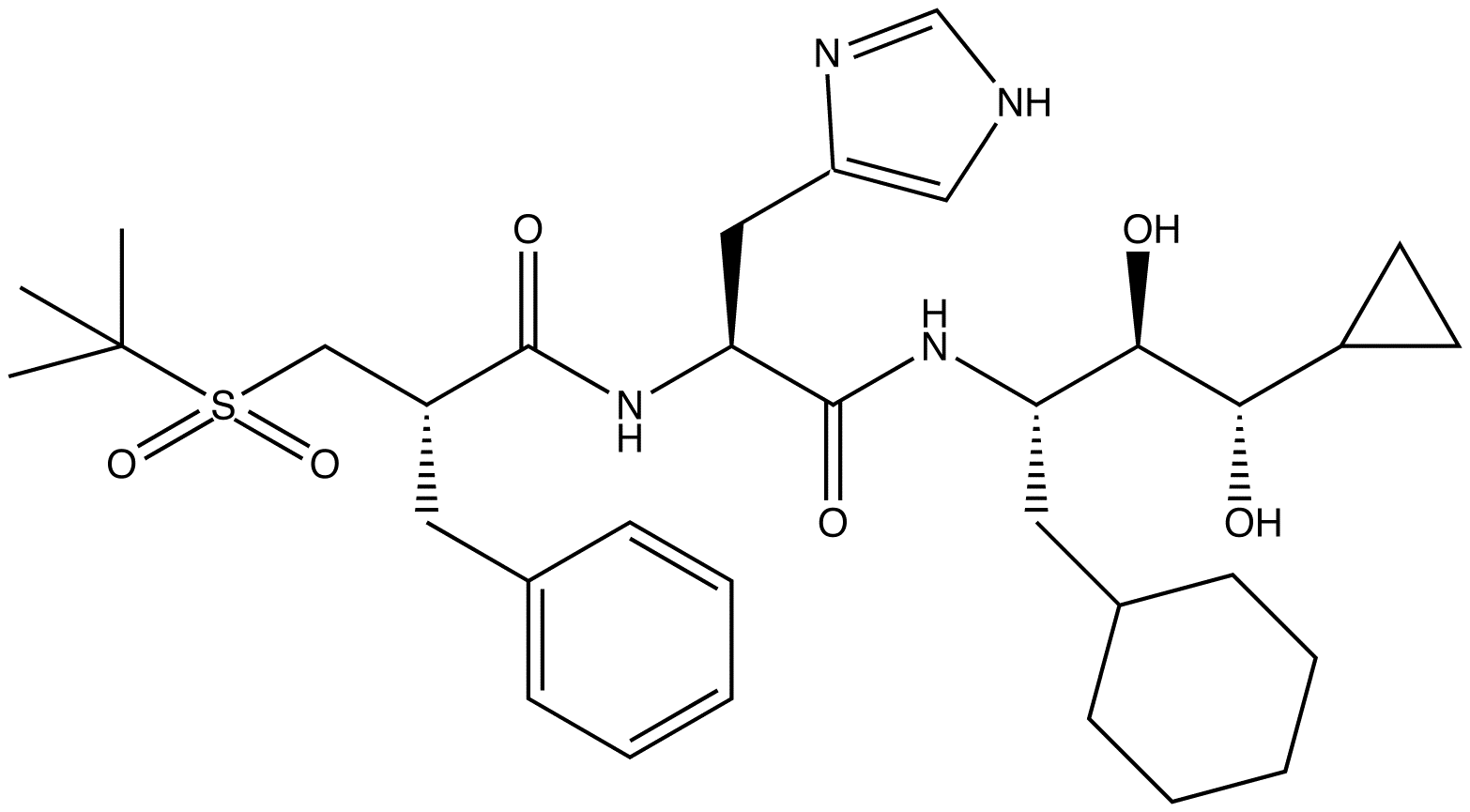
Remikiren, a second-generation renin inhibitor

Compounds in this generation were more potent, more stable and had longer durations of action. One of these, CGP2928, a peptidomimetic compound, was the first renin inhibitor proven effective when taken orally. Tested on marmosets, it was only active at high doses. Development of new drugs in the second generation continued to improve pharmacokinetic properties. Remikiren, enalkiren and zankiren were then discovered. These were peptidomimetic inhibitors with improved structures that made them more specific, potent and stable. Unfortunately, clinical development was terminated because the drugs had poor oral bioavailability (poorly absorbed and rapidly metabolized) and lowering blood pressure activity still remained low.

=== Third generation: non-peptides ===
Aliskiren, the third-generation renin inhibitor

Aliskiren, an orally active non-peptide renin inhibitor, was the first drug in its class on the market. It is used to treat hypertension as monotherapy or in combination with other antihypertensive agents. The key to the discovery of aliskiren was crystallography and molecular modeling techniques. Now, a solution has been found to the problem that impeded the development of the renin inhibitors of the previous generations. Non-peptide substances were known to be able to solve the problems of poor pharmacokinetic properties and low specificity. This led to the design of small molecules, non-peptide inhibitors, which were very potent and specific of human renin.

However, caused by their chemical structure even third-generation renin inhibitors are difficult to resorb by the human body and their oral bioavailability is often below 2%.

== Binding and structure activity relationship of renin inhibitors ==
The renin molecule is a monospecific enzyme that belongs to the aspartic protease family. Its structure is complex and consists of two homologous lobes that fold mainly in a β-sheet conformation. Between the two lobes, deep within the enzyme, resides the active site, and its catalytic activity is due to two aspartic acid residues (Asp32 and Asp 215, one from each lobe in the renin molecule). A flexible flap made from amino acids formed in a β-hairpin closes the active site by covering the cleft. The renin molecule contains both hydrophobic and hydrophilic amino acids. The hydrophilic ones tend to be on the outside of the molecule, while the hydrophobic ones tend to be more on the inside and form the active site, a large hydrophobic cavity that can accommodate a ligand with at least seven residues. The principal connection between a ligand and the enzyme is by hydrogen bonding. The residues are named after their places in the ligand, the residues closest to the cleavage site are named P1 and P1′ and they bind into the S1 and S1′ pockets, respectively. There are four S pockets, and three S′ pockets (table 1). The pockets alternate on either side of the backbone in the ligand. This alternation affects the orientation of the pockets, making the S3 and S1 pockets arrange together and the S2 pocket close to both S4 and S1′ pockets. Evidence suggests the closely arranged S1 and S3 pockets merge to form a spacious superpocket. Ligands that fill the superpocket have greater potency than those which do not, occupying increases potency 200-fold. These ligands can be structurally diverse and form van der Waals bonds to the surface of the superpocket. From the S3 pocket stretches a binding site distinct for renin, the S3^{sp} subpocket. The S3^{sp} subpocket can accommodate both hydrophobic and polar residues, the pocket can accommodate three water molecules, but has also lipophilic nature. The S3^{sp} subpocket is not conformationally flexible, so the residues occupying the pocket must have certain characteristics. They can not be sterically demanding and must have reasonably high number of rotatable bonds and be able to connect with hydrogen bonds. The S2 pocket is large, bipartite and hydrophobic, but can accommodate both hydrophobic and polar ligands. This diversity of possible polarity offers the P2 residue opportunity of variation in its connection to the enzyme. The S3-S1 and the S3^{sp} subpockets have been the main target of drug design, but recent discoveries have indicated other sites of interest. Interactions to the pockets on the S′ site have been proven to be critical for affinity, especially the S1′ and S2′, and in vitro tests have indicated the interaction with the flap region could be important to affinity.

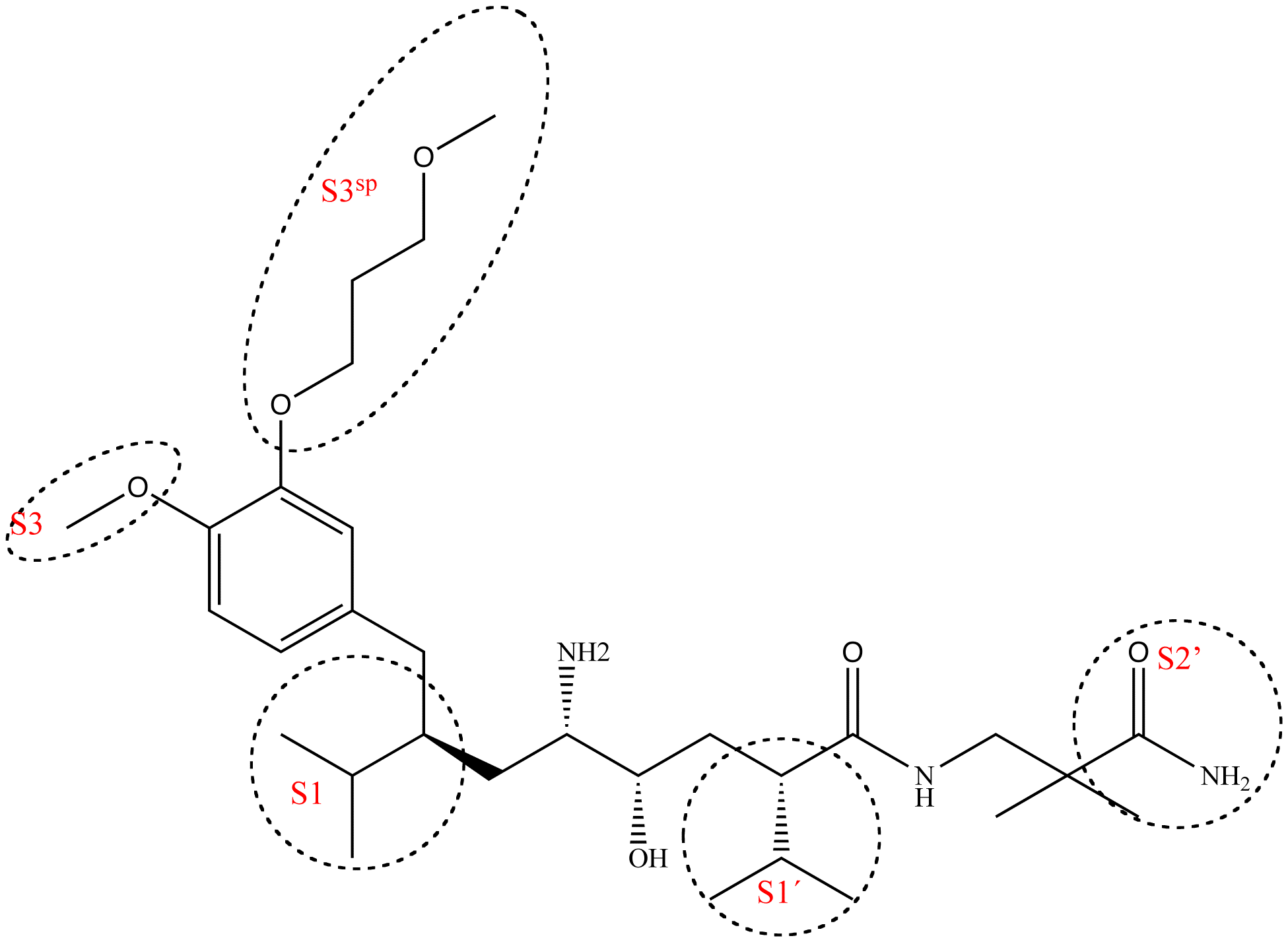
Binding pockets with which aliskiren connects

Characteristics of each pocket and the importance each residue in the ligand has to binding
Pocket	Characteristics	Subsite	Importance to binding
S4	Hydrophobic	P4	Relatively important for binding
S3	Hydrophobic	P3	Very important for binding
S3^{sp}	Equally hydrophobic/-philic	P3 side chain	Dramatically enhances binding affinity
S2	Large and hydrophobic	P2	Important for binding
S1	Large and hydrophobic	P1	NA
S1′	Primarily hydrophobic	P1′	Critical for tight binding
S2′	Polar	P2′	Critical for tight binding
S3′	NA	P3′	Structure and presence is not as important

Interaction with both aspartic acids in the active site results in a higher affinity. Higher affinity also results by occupying more active site pockets. However, some pockets contribute more to the affinity than others. A hydrophobic interaction with the S3^{sp} subpocket, S1 and S3 contribute to higher potency and affinity. By having a large and aromatic residue in P3 increases inhibitory activity. Occupation of the S3^{sp} subpocket can increase potency by 50-fold and results in tight binding.

Example of binding to the renin inhibitor: Aliskiren is a peptide-like renin inhibitor and, unlike most, it is rather hydrophilic. It blocks the catalytic function of the enzyme by occupying the S3 to S2′ pockets, except the S2 pocket. Aliskiren also binds to the S3^{sp} subpocket and because that pocket is distinct for renin, aliskiren does not inhibit other aspartic proteases, such as cathepsin D and pepsin. The side chain of aliskiren binds the S3^{sp} subpocket ideally, and leads to its quality as an inhibitor of human renin. The hydroxyl group in aliskiren forms a hydrogen bond with both oxygen atoms of the Asp32. The amine group forms a hydrogen bond with the carboxylic acid group of Gly217 and the oxygen atom of the Asp32. The methoxy group on the aromatic ring fills the S3 pocket and may possibly form a hydrogen bond with a secondary amine group of Tyr14. The amide group forms a hydrogen bond with a secondary amine group of Ser76. The S1 and S1′ pockets are occupied by the two propyl groups in positions P1 and P1′. The terminal amide in position P2′ anchors the amide tail in the active site by forming a hydrogen bond with Arg74 in the S2′ pocket.

== Current status ==
Aliskiren is effective in lowering blood pressure, but as of 20 April 2012 the US Food and Drug Administration (FDA) issued a warning of possible risks when using aliskiren or blood pressure medicines containing aliskiren with ACE inhibitors and angiotensin receptor blockers (ARBs) in patients with diabetes or kidney (renal) impairment. They advised that such drug combinations should not be used in patients with diabetes because of the risk of causing renal impairment, hypotension, and hyperkalemia and that aliskiren should not be used with ARBs or ACE inhibitors in patients with moderate to severe renal impairment (i.e., where glomerular filtration rate [GFR] < 60 mL/min). However, they also recommend that patients should not stop taking aliskiren without talking to a healthcare professional.

Aliskiren in combination with hydrochlorothiazide was approved by the FDA in 2008 under the tradename Tekturna HCT.

In 2007, Actelion/Merck and Speedel companies announced they had the next generation of renin inhibitors in clinical research. The lead compound from Actelion/Merck has entered phase II trials. One compound from Speedel, SPP635, has completed phase IIa. The results showed it was safe and well tolerated over a four-week period, and it reduced blood pressure by 9.8 to 17.9 mmHg. In 2008, SPP635 was continuing phase II development for hypertension in diabetic patients. More renin inhibitors from Speedel are in clinical trials. Two of them, SPP1148 and SPP676, have entered phase I. Other are in preclinical phases, the compound SPP1234 and compounds from the SPP800 series.

The next generation of renin inhibitors have shown potential improvements over previous generations where bioavailability has increased up to 30% in humans, and they have better tissue distribution.

== See also ==
- ACE inhibitor
- ACE inhibitors drug design
- Angiotensin
- Angiotensin II receptor antagonist
- Beta blocker
- Circulatory system
- Discovery and development of angiotensin receptor blockers
