= Extraglomerular mesangial cell =

- Diagram of renal corpuscle structure showing extraglomerular mesangial cell

Extraglomerular mesangial cells (also known as Lacis cells, Polkissen cells, or Goormaghtigh cells) are light-staining pericytes in the kidney found outside the glomerulus, near the vascular pole. They resemble smooth muscle cells and play a role in renal autoregulation of blood flow to the kidney and regulation of systemic blood pressure through the renin–angiotensin system. Extraglomerular mesangial cells are part of the juxtaglomerular apparatus, along with the macula densa cells of the distal convoluted tubule and the juxtaglomerular cells of the afferent arteriole.

The specific function of extraglomerular mesangial cells is not well understood, although it has been associated with the secretion of erythropoietin and secretion of renin. They are distinguished from intraglomerular mesangial cells, which are situated between the basement membrane and the epithelial cells within the glomerulus.

== See also ==
- mesangium
- intraglomerular mesangial cells
- List of human cell types derived from the germ layers
