= Eugenie Lumbers =

Australian medical researcher

Professor Eugenie Lumbers AM FAA FRSN

Personal details
- Occupation: Medical researcher

Eugenie Ruth Lumbers (also known as Eugenie Forbes) is an Australian medical researcher whose work has focused on the role of the renin-angiotensin system in fetal development and in women's health.

== Career ==
She earned her MBBS medical degrees and her MD doctorate from the University of Adelaide. She was the first woman to be awarded a CJ Martin Fellowship by the National Health and Medical Research Council of Australia, and with that funding she studied fetal physiology at Oxford University. In 1974 she joined the faculty of University of New South Wales (UNSW). She was awarded the degree of DSc in 1986 and became the first woman appointed as a Scientia Professor at UNSW in 1999. She was elected as Fellow to the Australian Academy of Science and received the Centenary Medal in 2002. In 2010, she was elected a Fellow of the Royal Society of New South Wales. In 2012, she was appointed a Member of the Order of Australia. She received a joint appointment at University of Queensland in 2009 and held that until 2011. She left UNSW in 2013 and received an appointment as a professor at University of Newcastle.

Along with Brian Morris she discovered prorenin, (the protein precursor of renin); her initial findings were met with disbelief from the field, when she began working on it during her doctoral studies. She has studied whether gene therapy could be a viable way to treat congenital diseases during fetal development, and has studied whether drugs that modulate the renin-angiotensis system could be useful to treat endometrial cancer.

== Selected publications ==
Five most-cited papers as of August 2018:

- Lumbers, ER (30 June 1971). "Activation of renin in human amniotic fluid by low pH". Enzymologia. 40 (6): 329–36. PMID 4105386.
- Skinner, SL; Lumbers, ER; Symonds, EM (February 1969). "Alteration by oral contraceptives of normal menstrual changes in plasma renin activity, concentration and substrate". Clinical Science. 36 (1): 67–76. PMID 4306500.
- Lumbers, ER; McCloskey, DI; Potter, EK (September 1979). "Inhibition by angiotensin II of baroreceptor-evoked activity in cardiac vagal efferent nerves in the dog". The Journal of Physiology. 294: 69–80. doi:10.1113/jphysiol.1979.sp012915. PMC 1280542. PMID 512963.
- Tangalakis, K; Lumbers, ER; Moritz, KM; Towstoless, MK; Wintour, EM (September 1992). "Effect of cortisol on blood pressure and vascular reactivity in the ovine fetus". Experimental Physiology. 77 (5): 709–17. doi:10.1113/expphysiol.1992.sp003637. PMID 1418954.
- Morris, BJ; Lumbers, ER (7 December 1972). "The activation of renin in human amniotic fluid by proteolytic enzymes". Biochimica et Biophysica Acta (BBA) - Enzymology. 289 (2): 385–91. doi:10.1016/0005-2744(72)90090-3. PMID 4568061.
