= Gamma-Renin =

Gamma-renin

Identifiers
- EC no.: 3.4.21.54
- CAS no.: 85270-20-8

Databases
- IntEnz: IntEnz view
- BRENDA: BRENDA entry
- ExPASy: NiceZyme view
- KEGG: KEGG entry
- MetaCyc: metabolic pathway
- PRIAM: profile
- PDB structures: RCSB PDB PDBe PDBsum
Search
- PMC: articles
- PubMed: articles
- NCBI: proteins

Gamma-renin (EC 3.4.21.54) is an enzyme. This enzyme catalyses the following chemical reaction

Cleavage of the Leu-Leu bond in synthetic renin substrate (horse), to produce angiotensin I, but not active on natural angiotensinogen

This enzyme is present in submandibular glands of male mice.
