= Plasma renin activity =

- Purpose: measure of the activity of the plasma enzyme renin,

Plasma renin activity (PRA), also known as the renin (active) assay or random plasma renin, is a measure of the activity of the plasma enzyme renin, which plays a major role in the body's regulation of blood pressure, thirst, and urine output. Measure of direct renin concentration (DRC) is technically more demanding, and hence PRA is used instead. DRC assays are still in evolution, and generally a conversion factor of PRA (ng/mL/h) to DRC (mU/L) is 8.2. A recently developed and already commonly used automated DRC assay uses the conversion factor of 12. PRA is sometimes measured, specially in case of certain diseases which present with hypertension or hypotension. PRA is also raised in certain tumors. A PRA measurement may be compared to a plasma aldosterone concentration as an aldosterone-to-renin ratio (ARR).

== Measurement and values ==
Measurement is done from a sample of venous blood using immunological measuring mechanisms like ELISA, RIA, etc. Often these are done by automated machines to minimize human error.

=== Considerations for variation ===
Factors to take into account when interpreting results

- Age: in patients aged 65 years, renin can be lowered more than aldosterone by age alone, leading to raised ARR.
- Gender: premenstrual, ovulating females have higher ARR levels than age-matched men, especially during the luteal phase of the menstrual cycle, during which false positives can occur, but only if renin is measured as Direct renin concentration (DRC) and not as PRA (220).
- Time of day, recent diet, posture, and length of time in that posture
- State of water intake and hydration
- Salt intake
- Medications – Use of anti-hypertensive drugs, estrogen-containing forms of hormonal contraception, anti-anginals drugs, etc. (basically, most drugs that are active on the heart, blood vessels and/or the kidneys)
- Level of potassium
- Level of creatinine (kidney failure can lead to false-positive ARR)
- Certain diseases of the heart, kidneys, etc.
- Method of blood collection, including any difficulty doing so

=== Normal values ===
Reference ranges for blood tests of plasma renin activity can be given both in mass and in international units (μIU/mL or equivalently mIU/L, improperly shown as μU/mL or U/L, confusing mcU/mL used where Greek μ not available), with the former being roughly convertible to the latter by multiplying with 11.2. The following table gives the lower limit (2.5th percentile) and upper limit (97.5th percentile) for plasma renin activity by mass and MCU, with different values owing to various factors of variability of reference ranges:

Unit	Lower limit	Upper limit
ng/(mL*hour)	0.29, 1.9	3.7
μIU/mL	3.3, 21	41

=== Results and explanations ===
Please go through the physiology of renin and of the renin–angiotensin system to understand why the following occur.

Higher-than-normal levels may indicate:

Disease	Brief Description
Addison's disease	Kidneys trying to counter low aldosterone output.
Cirrhosis of the liver	RAAS activates as a compensatory response to the splanchnic arterial vasodilation due to portal hypertension
Essential hypertension	Just more of renin is being secreted by the kidneys.
Hemorrhage (bleeding)	Kidneys trying to raise falling blood pressure.
Hypokalemia	Kidneys trying to raise falling blood pressure due to reduced cardiac output.
Malignant hypertension	Excessive renin is being secreted by the kidneys.
Renin-producing renal tumors	Tumors can secrete substances like this. See tumor markers
Renovascular hypertension	Renal vascular damage leading to reduced JGA perfusion.

Lower-than-normal levels may indicate:

Disease	Brief Description
ADH therapy	Leads to water retention and thus raised blood pressure.
Salt-retaining steroid therapy	see above
Salt-sensitive essential hypertension	see above
Primary Hyperaldosteronism	see above and direct inhibition of aldosterone on renin secretion
