= Renin stability regulatory element (REN-SRE) =

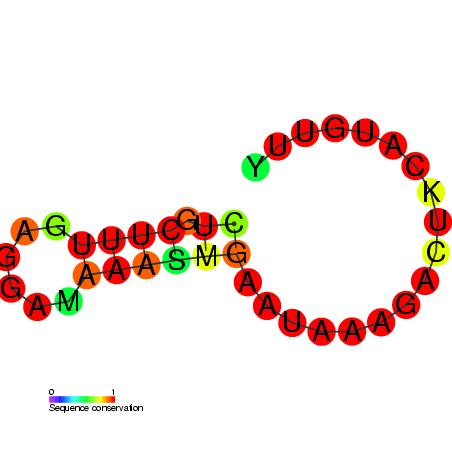
- Predicted secondary structure and sequence conservation of REN-SRE

Identifiers
- Symbol: REN-SRE
- Rfam: RF00180

Other data
- RNA type: Cis-reg
- Domain(s): Eukaryota
- SO: SO:0000205
- PDB structures: PDBe

The Renin stability regulatory element (REN-SRE) is a cis-acting element identified in the 3'untranslated region (3'UTR) of the renin (REN) gene. It acts to regulate the levels of renin protein produced in the cell. Renin is secreted by renal juxtaglomerular cells and catalyses the conversion of angiotensinogen into angiotensin I which is the rate-limiting step in the production of angiotensin II. Angiotensin II induces hypertension and REN therefore requires tight expression control.

REN-SRE is thought to act by destabilising the REN messenger RNA (mRNA) and promoting degradation of the mRNA sequence. It has been found that a number of proteins bind to the REN-SRE to stabilise the mRNA and promote translation.
