= Renin receptor =

Protein-coding gene in the species Homo sapiens

ATP6AP2

Identifiers
- Aliases: ATP6AP2, APT6M8-9, ATP6IP2, ATP6M8-9, ELDF10, M8-9, MRXE, MRXSH, MSTP009, PRR, RENR, XMRE, XPDS, HT028, ATPase H+ transporting accessory protein 2, CDG2R
- External IDs: OMIM: 300556; MGI: 1917745; GeneCards: ATP6AP2
Available structures
PDB	Ortholog search: PDBe RCSB
PDB	List of PDB id codes 3LBS, 3LC8

Gene location (Human)
Chr.	X chromosome (human)
Band	Xp11.4	Start	40,579,372 bp
Band	Xp11.4	End	40,606,848 bp

Gene location (Mouse)
Chr.	X chromosome (mouse)
Band	X|X A1.1	Start	12,454,040 bp
Band	X|X A1.1	End	12,483,288 bp
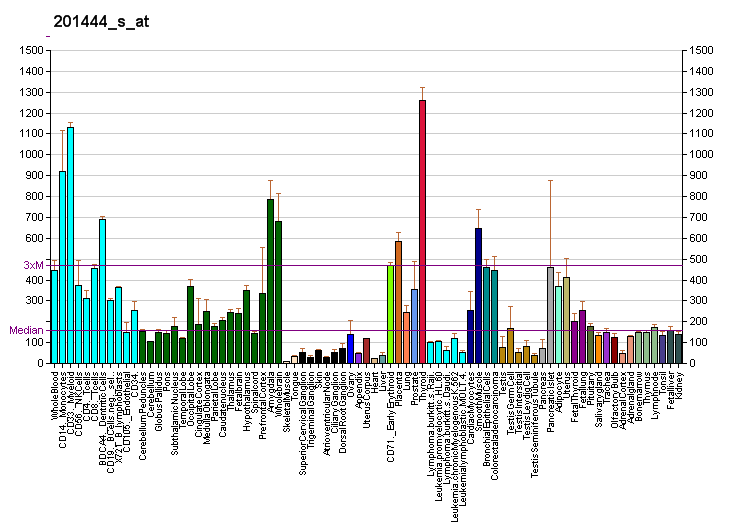

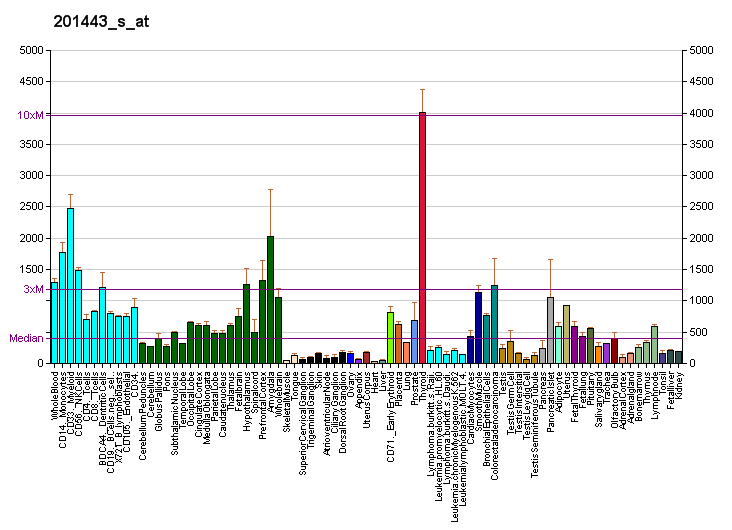
RNA expression pattern
Bgee	Human / Mouse (ortholog); Top expressed in: visceral pleura; tibia; germinal epithelium; parietal pleura; epithelium of nasopharynx; retinal pigment epithelium; mucosa of paranasal sinus; orbitofrontal cortex; lateral nuclear group of thalamus; renal medulla / Top expressed in: Epithelium of choroid plexus; Paneth cell; ciliary body; iris; retinal pigment epithelium; conjunctival fornix; substantia nigra; medial dorsal nucleus; medial geniculate nucleus; aortic valve; More reference expression data
BioGPS	More reference expression data
Gene ontology
Molecular function	protein binding; enzyme binding; signaling receptor activity
Cellular component	integral component of membrane; plasma membrane; extracellular exosome; membrane; external side of plasma membrane; neuron projection; cell body; tertiary granule membrane; ficolin-1-rich granule membrane; extracellular space; apical plasma membrane
Biological process	positive regulation of transforming growth factor beta1 production; rostrocaudal neural tube patterning; head morphogenesis; regulation of MAPK cascade; eye pigmentation; angiotensin maturation; positive regulation of Wnt signaling pathway; neutrophil degranulation
Sources:Amigo / QuickGO
Orthologs
Databases	NCBI: entry; OMA: entry
Species	Human	Mouse
Entrez	10159	70495
Ensembl	ENSG00000182220	ENSMUSG00000031007
UniProt	O75787	Q9CYN9
RefSeq (mRNA)	NM_005765	NM_027439
RefSeq (protein)	NP_005756	NP_081715
Location (UCSC)	Chr X: 40.58 – 40.61 Mb	Chr X: 12.45 – 12.48 Mb
PubMed search
- Wikidata
View/Edit Human	View/Edit Mouse

The renin receptor also known as ATPase H(+)-transporting lysosomal accessory protein 2, or the prorenin receptor, is a protein that in humans is encoded by the ATP6AP2 gene.

== Function ==
The renin receptor binds renin and prorenin. Binding of renin to this receptor induces the conversion of angiotensinogen to angiotensin I.

This protein is associated with proton-translocating ATPases which have fundamental roles in energy conservation, secondary active transport, acidification of intracellular compartments, and cellular pH homeostasis. There are three classes of ATPases- F, P, and V. The vacuolar (V-type) ATPases have a transmembrane proton-conducting sector and an extramembrane catalytic sector. This protein has been found associated with the transmembrane sector of the V-type ATPases.
