= Robert Tigerstedt =

Finnish medical scientist and physiologist

- Robert Tigerstedt at his library table, Helsinki, Finland.
- Born: Robert Adolph Armand Tigerstedt; 28 February 1853; Helsinki, Grand Duchy of Finland, Russian Empire
- Died: 12 February 1923 (aged 69); Helsinki, Finland
- Education: University of Helsinki
- Known for: Discovery of renin

Robert Adolph Armand Tigerstedt (28 February 1853 – 12 February 1923) was a Finnish medical scientist and physiologist. With his student Per Bergman, he discovered renin at the Karolinska Institute, Stockholm, Sweden, in 1898. Renin is a component of the renin–angiotensin system which regulates blood pressure, salt and water homeostasis and is an important therapeutic target. Tigerstedt is also recognised as an educator, author and social campaigner.

== Biography ==
=== Early life ===
Tigerstedt was born in Helsinki on 28 February 1853. His parents were Karl Konstatin Tigerstedt and Evelina Theresia Tigerstedt (née Degerman). Karl Konstatin was a professor of history at the University of Helsinki.

=== Adult life ===
Tigerstedt matriculated from Åbo Gymnasium in Turku in 1869, and then studied physical and natural sciences at the University of Helsinki, where he was taught by the notable chemist Carl Axel Arrhenius. He graduated from the University of Helsinki with a Master of Arts degree in 1873 and added a Bachelor of Science degree in 1876. Subsequently, Tigerstedt studied medicine from 1876 to 1880. In 1878 he married his Ukrainian cousin, Ljuba Ludmila Martinau (1850–1935) and their first child, Maria (Ljubow Marie Nathalie Eveline (1879–1975)), was born while Tigerstedt was still a medical student. Two further children, Carl Christian Oskar Robert (1882–1930) and Margareta Wilhelmina Maria (1891–1980) followed. After completing his medical studies, in 1881 Tigerstedt submitted his doctorate entitled 'über Mechanische Nervenreizung' (On the mechanical stimulation of the nervous system) in Helsinki; however due to opposition from Konrad Hällstén, the professor of Physiology at Helsinki, he was unable to get a job in Helsinki and in 1881 he moved to Stockholm to become a demonstrator in the newly founded department of physiology headed by Christian Lóven in the Karolinska Institute.

==== Stockholm ====
Tigerstedt remained at the Karolinska for the next 20 years, initially as Lóven's assistant and then as professor of physiology when Lóven retired in 1886. Tigerstedt undertook most of his major scientific work, including the discovery of renin during his two decades at the Karolinska Institute in Stockholm. His early research was mainly into nerve and muscle physiology, but in 1881 he started work on the physiology of the circulation in Carl Ludwig's laboratory. While there, in 1884, he showed that independent atrial and ventricular rhythms could be generated in mammalian hearts after damaging the atrium. Alongside his work on the heart and circulation, he also performed important studies in metabolism and nutrition, and with Klas Gustaf Anders Sondén designed the Sonden-Tigerstedt respiration chamber. Tigerstedt also began writing his classic 'Lehrbuch der Physiologie des Menschens (Textbook of Human Physiology)' during this period. His friend Ivan Pavlov called it 'the greatest textbook of physiology ever written' and it exerted a considerable worldwide influence. Tigerstedt was fluent in several languages, edited four scientific journals concurrently, authored numerous articles in popular magazines, wrote an extensive range of biographical works on famous scientists, and made important contributions to modernizing the teaching of medical sciences in Stockholm and later in Helsinki. He was a teetotaller and was a leading figure in the temperance movement in Finland and abroad, although he was opposed to prohibition. Tigerstedt was a member of Svenska Nykterhetssällskapet (the Swedish Temperance Society) and served as its vice president from 1893.

==== Helsinki ====
In 1901 Tigerstedt left Stockholm to take up the chair in Physiology at Helsinki University following the retirement of Hällstén. At this time Finland was not an independent state and Tigerstedt may have had nationalistic motives in returning; certainly the return of such a prestigious scientist was hailed in Finland. In Helsinki Tigerstedt continued his work as a physiologist, educator, author and remained active in social reform. From 1916–1919 he was Dean of the Faculty of Medicine at Helsinki. In 1918 Finland achieved independence from Russia and Tigerstedt retired from the university in 1919, although he continued to lecture. Tigerstedt's work on nutrition may have been used to inform rationing during the war shortages, and after the Finnish Civil War he was appointed chief physician for the Ekenäs prison camp. He and his son Carl wrote critical reports on conditions in the prison camps; in one in August 1918 Tigerstedt noted that 'between 6 July and 31 July 1918, the number of detainees that were held in the camp at Tampere and the adjacent prison varied between 6,027 and 8,597. 2,347 prisoners died in these twenty-six days and the weekly mortality-rate among detainees was as high as 407 per thousand.' This report was leaked and published in various national and international newspapers to the embarrassment of the government. Tigerstedt also served as chairman of the committee for assistance to Finnish children (1919–1921), and served on other national committees related to the Finnish army and air force. In his retirement Tigerstedt continued to write; his encyclopaedic Physiology of the Circulation was published shortly before his death from a heart attack in 1923.

=== Discovery of renin ===
Tigerstedt's work on renin was probably inspired by Brown-Sequard's work examining the effect of organ extracts on physiological function. In 1898 Tigerstedt and Bergman made extracts of rabbit kidney and injected them into rabbits. They observed that even a very small amount of the extract increased blood pressure (probably measured by Ludwig's kymograph). They showed that the substance, which they called renin, was present in extract of renal cortex or venous blood from the kidney but not in urine, extract of renal medulla or the arterial blood supplying the kidney. They further showed that the pressor effect of renin did not require an intact nervous system and that it was not accompanied by a change in heart rate. They concluded that renin caused vasoconstriction, but the mechanism was unknown. This question would remain unresolved until the work of Harry Goldblatt, Irvine Page, Eduardo Braun-Menenez and others in the 1930s.

=== Nobel Prize Committee ===
Tigerstedt was a friend of Alfred Nobel and after Nobel's death Tigerstedt and Karl Mörner were asked by the Karolinska institute to enact the terms of Nobel's will. In 1901 Tigerstedt was selected as one of the committee for inaugural Nobel Prize. Tigerstedt had heard of Pavlov's work while visiting Ludwig's laboratory. and he nominated Ivan Pavlov for the prize. Since Tigerstedt spoke Russian, he and J. E. Johannson, Professor of Experimental Physiology at the Karolinska, were sent to St Petersburg to visit Pavlov and his laboratory. This consolidated what was to become a long friendship between Tigerstedt and Pavlov. Tigerstedt again nominated Pavlov for the Nobel prize in 1904 – this time Pavlov's nomination was successful and he received the Nobel prize for Physiology or Medicine.

== Awards and honours ==
Tigerstedt was nominated twice for the Nobel prize in Physiology or Medicine; once in 1919 for 'his work on physiology, construction of the respirator and studies on nutrition' and once again in 1923 for "Die Physiologie des Kreislaufes" ("The physiology of the blood circulation") but was unsuccessful on each occasion. Tigerstedt was nominated for the Swedish Academy of Sciences Award in 1882 and 1889, and he was made a member of the Academy in 1890. Tigerstedt also received the Swedish Medical Society Award in 1894 and 1899, and he was invited to be an honorary member of the Swedish Medical Society in 1900. In Finland, Tigerstedt was made an honorary member of the English medical society in 1919. In 1916 he was elected President of the International Congress of Physiology in Paris. The congress was cancelled due to World War I and after the war Tigerstedt resigned the presidency in protest at the exclusion of Germany from the reconvened congress in 1920. Tigerstedt was awarded the Cothenius Medal by the Leopoldina Academy of Sciences in 1919. Tigerstedt was also awarded honorary Doctorates from the University of Helsinki (1907), Christiania (1911), Dublin University (1912). Groningen (1914) and the Tartu University School of Medicine (1922). In 1989 the International Union of Physiological Sciences celebrated its centennial in Helsinki. Tigerstedt, one of the founders of the organization was commemorated by release of a Finnish postage stamp showing the silhouettes of Tigerstedt and Ragnar Granit (Nobel Laureate in Physiology or Medicine in 1967) with an image of a heart and Tigerstedt's blood flow meter.

=== Eponymous awards ===
Since 1974 the International Society of Hypertension has made 'The Robert Tigerstedt Lifetime Achievement Award' every two years to 'a person, persons or institution responsible for distinguished work relating to the aetiology, epidemiology, pathology or treatment of high blood pressure'. The American Society of Hypertension confers a 'Robert Tigerstedt Distinguished Scientist Award' onto leading blood pressure researchers. The Finnish Hypertension Society also confers a 'Robert Tigerstedt Award' onto eminent researchers in the field of the renin–angiotensin system.

== Publications ==
- Tigerstedt R., Bergman P.G. (1898). "Niere und Kreislauf". Skand Arch Physiol. 4: 223–271.
- Tigerstedt, R. Lehrbuch der Physiologie der Kreislauf. Leipzig, Germany: Verlag Von Veit, 1893.
- Tigerstedt, R., Fagerlund, L.W., & Estlander, C.G., Medicinens studium vid Åbo universitet. Helsingfors, Finland, 1890.
- Tigerstedt, R. Physiologische Übungen und Demonstrationen. S. Hirzel, 1913.
- Tigerstedt, R. Handbuch der physiologischen Methodik. S. Hirzel, 1914.
- Tigerstedt, R. Tieteellistä kritiikkiä. Helsinki, Otava, 1920.
- Tigerstedt, R. Die Physiologie des Kreislaufes. Vereinigung Wissensachaftlicher Verleger Walter de Gruyter, 1921.
