= Paul Korner =

Australian physician (1925–2012)

Paul Ivan Korner AO (18 November 1925 – 3 October 2012) was a Czech–Australian cardiac physiologist noted for his contributions to the understanding of hypertension, especially essential hypertension.

== Early life and education ==
Paul Ivan Korner was born in Moravská Ostrava, Czechoslovakia (Ostrava, Czech Republic) as the older of two sons of Ernst Korner and Edith (née Singer).

Korner attended Barker College and the University of Sydney, where he commenced medical studies before taking a break to earn a B.Sc. (1946) and a M.Sc. (1947). He completed his medical education in 1951 and undertook his internship at the Royal Prince Alfred Hospital.

During his education and training, he was heavily influenced by Frank Cotton, Hugh Kingsley Ward, and, later, (C.) Ruthven (B.) Blackburn.

== Career ==
Korner was the Foundation Professor and Head of the School of Physiology and Pharmacology at the University of New South Wales.

Korner was a director of the Baker Medical Research Institute in Melbourne.

In 1979, the High Blood Pressure Research Council of Australia was formed, in large part due to Korner.

From the 1950s till his death, Korner published in excess of 330 research works. In 2007 the synthesis of his research work was published as "Essential hypertension and its causes"

In 1990 he was appointed an Officer of the Order of Australia (AO).

== Death ==
After a brief illness, Korner died at North Shore Private Hospital in St Leonards, New South Wales, Australia. At the time, Korner resided in Woolwich, a suburb on the lower North Shore of Sydney. He was survived by his wife, Jennifer (née Woods); his children, Nicholas, Anthony, and Harriet; and grandchildren, Mauricio, John, Brayan, Tom, Daniel, and Paul.

=== Legacy ===
A weekly seminar series presented by doctoral students and postdoctoral researchers at the Victor Chang Cardiac Research Institute, located in Darlinghurst, New South Wales, Australia, has been named in honour of Korner.

== Personal life ==
Korner married Jennifer, with whom he had three children. Aged 19 and while a medical student on break, at Burragorang Valley, New South Wales, he met his future wife, then aged 16.
