= Refractory hypertension =

Uncontrolled hypertension

- Other names: Status angiotensus, refractory hypertension
- Specialty: Cardiology, Nephrology
- Causes: Increased sympathetic nervous system activity
- Risk factors: Black race; obesity; diabetes mellitus; chronic kidney disease
- Differential diagnosis: Resistant hypertension

Refractory hypertension (RfHTN) is hypertension, a high blood pressure, that remains uncontrolled on maximal or near-maximal therapy, that includes the use of ≥5 antihypertensive agents of different classes. Agents used include a long-acting thiazide-like diuretic (such as chlorthalidone) and spironolactone. Refractory hypertension is typically associated with increased sympathetic nervous system activity. The phenotype of refractory hypertension was first proposed in a retrospective analysis of patients referred to the University of Alabama at Birmingham Hypertension Clinic whose blood pressure could not be controlled on any antihypertensive regimen.

Observational studies suggest that RfHTN is rare, affecting <5% of patients.

== Apparent versus true ==
The term apparent refractory hypertension, as opposed to true refractory hypertension is used by investigators to refer to patients with resistant hypertension based on the number of prescribed medications, without accounting for common causes of pseudo-resistance, ie, inaccurate blood pressure measurements, nonadherence, undertreatment, or white-coat effects. These phenomena are well understood in resistant hypertension, but not in refractory hypertension. The white-coat effect is reportedly much more prevalent in RfHTN than in resistant hypertension, but the other causes of apparent resistant hypertension remain unstudied in refractory hypertension. Specifically, none of the studies of refractory hypertension has reported adherence based on measurement of drug or drug metabolite levels in serum or urine.

== Cause ==
Transthoracic impedance cardiography, combined with assessment of arterial stiffness, suggests that status angiotensus may not be secondary to persistent excess fluid retention, but instead is likely neurogenic in pathogenesis, and attributable to heightened sympathetic outflow.

== Risk factors ==
Risk factors for RfHTN overlap with those for resistant hypertension including Black race, obesity, diabetes mellitus, and chronic kidney disease. However, patients with refractory hypertension tend to be younger and more often women than those with resistant hypertension.

== Treatment ==
By definition, refractory hypertension cannot be effectively treated. RfHTN does not respond to diuretics; calcium channel blockers; ACE, or renin inhibitors; endothelium receptor blockers; Angiotensin II, Adrenergic, Aldosterone, or Alpha-2 adrenergic receptor agonists; or Vasodilators.

== Terminology ==
The term resistant hypertension has been used since the early 1960s to identify patients with difficult-to-treat hypertension. In 2008, the American Heart Association defined resistant hypertension as blood pressure uncontrolled with 3 medications, but controlled with ≥4 medications. The lack of a similar codified definition of refractory hypertension has led to some discrepancy in terminology. Status angiotensus and refractory hypertensive state are usually used as synonyms for refractory hypertension and RfHTN, however sometimes they can describe a sudden acute hypertensive crisis arising from refractory hypertension.
