= Juxtaglomerular cell tumor =

- Other names: Reninoma
- Specialty: Nephrology/oncology

Juxtaglomerular cell tumor (JCT, JGCT, also reninoma) is an extremely rare kidney tumour of the juxtaglomerular cells, with fewer than 100 cases reported in literature. This tumor typically secretes renin, hence the former name of reninoma. It often causes severe hypertension that is difficult to control, in adults and children, although among causes of secondary hypertension it is rare. It develops most commonly in young adults, but can be diagnosed much later in life. It is generally considered benign, but its malignant potential is uncertain.

== Pathophysiology ==
By hypersecretion of renin, JCT causes hypertension, often severe and usually sustained but occasionally paroxysmal, and secondary hyperaldosteronism inducing hypokalemia, though the later can be mild despite high renin. Both of these conditions may be corrected by surgical removal of the tumor. Asymptomatic cases have been reported.

== Histopathology ==
JCT is morphologically characterized by multiple foci malignant mesenchymal epithelioid cells with, often with admixed necrosis, and a perivascular growth pattern. The immunophenotype is rather characteristic, as the neoplastic cells express renin, CD34, smooth muscle actin, CD138, vimentin, collagen IV and is negative for cytokeratins as well as for S100, c-Kit and desmin.

== Diagnosis ==
Clinically, hypertension, especially when severe or poorly controlled, combined with evidence of a kidney tumor via imaging or gross examination suggest a JCT. Other kidney tumors can cause hypertension by secreting renin. JCTs have a variable appearance and have often being misdiagnosed as renal cell carcinomas; dynamic computed tomography is helpful in the differential diagnosis.

Post-operatively, the presence of renin granules in pathology specimens as well as immunohistochemical analyses could help differentiating this tumor from other primary renal tumors such as hemangiopericytoma, glomus tumor, metanephric adenoma, epithelioid angiomyolipoma, Wilms tumor, solitary fibrous tumor, and some epithelial neoplasms.

== Prognosis ==
JCT is often described as benign and one case of metastasis has been reported, so its malignant potential is uncertain. In most cases the tumor is encapsulated.

== History ==
Juxtaglomerular cell tumor was first described in 1967 in a paper by Robertson et al., and first named by Kihara et al. in 1968. Since then, approximately 100 case reports have been published. Karyotyping of a small number of these tumors revealed a common loss of chromosomes 9 and 11.
