= Dipsogen =

A dipsogen (from Greek: δίψα (dipsa), "thirst" and the suffix -gen, "to create") is an agent that causes thirst.

A common example is Angiotensin II (ANG II), which is a potent dipsogen in all vertebrate species except cyclostomes, hagfishes and lampreys. Adrenomedullin (AM) is another potent dipsogen.

Anti-dipsogenic hormones are substances that inhibit drinking. Examples of these include atrial natriuretic peptide (ANP) and ghrelin (GRLN).
