= CYT006-AngQb =

Investigational vaccine designed to lower blood pressure

Vaccine description
- Target: Hypertension
- Vaccine type: Conjugate

Clinical data
- Routes of administration: Subcutaneous
- ATC code: none

Legal status
- Legal status: Abandoned

Identifiers
- ChemSpider: none

CYT006-AngQb was an investigational vaccine against angiotensin II, designed to lower blood pressure. It was somewhat effective in clinical trials, but less so than conventional drugs against hypertension (elevated blood pressure).

== Method of action ==
Angiotensin II causes blood vessels to constrict, and drives blood pressure up. CYT006-AngQb consists of virus-like particles covalently coupled to angiotensin II. Subcutaneous injection causes the immune system to produce antibodies which reduce angiotensin II blood levels, lowering blood pressure.

== Studies ==
In a 2008 phase IIa study, 72 patients received 100 μg, 300 μg or placebo in weeks 0, 4, and 12. Blood pressure was lowered dose-dependently, by 5.6 mmHg (systolic) and 2.8 mmHg (diastolic) in the 300 μg group. Morning blood pressure (5:00-8:00) was lowered by 25 mmHg (systolic) and 13 mmHg (diastolic).

Side effects were mild and included local reactions, headache and fatigue.

The 2008 trial was small and exploratory. It did not address the question of whether the vaccine actually protects internal organs, nor did it address safety concerns such as whether the vaccine would cause autoimmune disease. If a standard drug treatment is found to dangerously inhibit the renin-angiotensin-aldosterone system, it can be withdrawn and the effects reversed quickly, but that would not be true of the vaccine. However, poor compliance to standard treatment is the main reason for inadequate control of blood pressure, and if vaccination were safe and effective in the long run, it may solve many compliance problems.

CYT006-AngQb did not reach Phase III studies because the antihypertensive effects were small compared to existing ACE inhibitors and angiotensin II receptor antagonists, and they were not reproducible across dosing schemes. Similar vaccines with modified immunogens and different adjuvants are being investigated.
