= Comparison of international blood pressure guidelines =

Guidelines on the choice of agents and how best to step up treatment for various subgroups in hypertension (high blood pressure) have changed over time and differ between countries.

A Comparison of International Guidelines on Goal Blood Pressure and Initial Therapy for Adults With Hypertension (adapted from JNC 8 guidelines)
Guideline	Population	Goal blood pressure (mmHg)	Initial treatment options
AHA/ACC 2025	General	<130/80	BP ≥140/90: Two from different classes: thiazide diuretic, long-acting dihydropyridine CCB, and ACEi or ARB BP ≥130/80: One of: thiazide diuretic, long-acting dihydropyridine CCB, ACEi or ARB
ESC 2024	General	120–129/70–79	BP >140/90: Two from different classes: preferably RAS-inhibitor (ACEi or ARB) with either thiazide diuretic/thiazide-like diuretic or dihydropyridine CCB
ESH 2023	Age <65 Age 65–79 Age ≥80	<130/80 <140 SBP <150 SBP	BP <150/95: Lifestyle changes BP ≥150/95 or has CVD risk factors or failed lifestyle changes: Two from different classes: thiazide-type diuretic, ACEi/ARB, and/or CCB
AAFP 2022	General	<140/90	BP >140/90 and low-risk for CVD: Lifestyle changes BP >140/90 and CVD risk factors or failed lifestyle changes: monotherapy with thiazide-type diuretic, ACEi/ARB, and/or CCB BP >160/100: Two from different classes: thiazide-type diuretic, ACEi/ARB, and/or CCB
WHO 2021	General High CVD risk, diabetes or CKD Previous CVD	<140/90 <130 SBP <130 SBP	BP ≥140/90 and low-risk for CVD: Two from different classes: thiazide-type diuretic, ACEi/ARB, and/or CCB SBP ≥130 and CVD risk factors, diabetes or CKD: Two from different classes: thiazide-type diuretic, ACEi/ARB, and/or CCB SBP ≥130 and previous CVD: Two from different classes: thiazide-type diuretic, ACEi/ARB, and/or CCB
KDIGO 2021	CKD with kidney transplant	<120 SBP <130/80	CKD: ACEi/ARB Kidney transplant: ARB or CCB
ISH 2020	General Age <65 Age ≥65	<140/90 (reduction by at least 20/10) <130/80 <140/90	BP >140/90 and low-risk for CVD: Lifestyle changes BP >140/90 and CVD risk factors or failed lifestyle changes: monotherapy with thiazide-type diuretic, ACEi/ARB, and/or CCB BP >160/100: Two from different classes: thiazide-type diuretic, ACEi/ARB, and/or CCB
VA/DoD 2020	General Age ≥60 Age ≥60 with diabetes	<130/90 <150/90 <140/90	Thiazide-type diuretic, ACEi/ARB, and/or CCB Black: avoid monotherapy with ACEi/ARB
NICE 2019	Age <80 Age ≥80	<140/90 <150/90	Age <55: ACEi/ARB Age ≥55 or black: CCB
ADA 2018	Diabetes Diabetes with CVD risk	<140/90 <130/80	ACEi/ARB, thiazide-like diuretic, and/or dihydropyridine CCB
ESC/ESH 2018	Age <65 Age ≥65	<130/80 <140/80	Thiazide-type diuretic, ACEi/ARB, and/or CCB CAD: add beta-blocker Resistant hypertension: add spironolactone
ACC/AHA 2017	General	<130/80	BP > 130/80: Lifestyle changes and monotherapy with thiazide-type diuretic, ACEi/ARB, and/or CCB BP >20/10 above target: Lifestyle changes and two from different classes: thiazide-type diuretic, ACEi/ARB, and/or CCB
JNC 8 2013	General age ≥60 General age <60 Diabetes CKD	<150/90 <140/90 <140/90 <140/90	Non-black: thiazide-type diuretic, ACEi/ARB, and/or CCB Black: thiazide-type diuretic, and/or CCB Diabetes: thiazide-type diuretic, ACEi/ARB, and/or CCB CKD: ACEi/ARB
CHEP 2013	General age <80 General age ≥80 Diabetes CKD	<140/90 <150/90 <130/80 <140/90	General: thiazide-type diuretic, beta-blocker (age < 60), ACEi (non-black) or ARB Diabetes with additional risk : ACEi/ARB Diabetes without additional risk : ACEi/ARB, thiazide, or DHPCCB CKD: ACEi, or ARB
ISHIB 2010	Black, lower risk Target organ damage or CVD risk	<135/85 <130/80	Diuretic or CCB

Abbreviations:

- ACEi – angiotensin-converting enzyme inhibitor
- ARB – angiotensin receptor blocker
- BP – blood pressure
- CCB – calcium channel blocker
- DHPCCB – dihydropyridine calcium channel blocker
- CKD – chronic kidney disease
- CVD – cardiovascular disease
- SBP – systolic blood pressure
