= Remikiren =

Chemical compound

Clinical data
- ATC code: C09XA01 (WHO)

Legal status
- Legal status: Investigational

Identifiers
- IUPAC name: (2S)-2-[(2R)-2-benzyl-3-(2-methylpropane-2-sulfonyl)propanamido]-N-[(2R,3S,4R)-1-cyclohexyl-4-cyclopropyl-3,4-dihydroxybutan-2-yl]-3-(1H-imidazol-4-yl)propanamide
- CAS Number: 126222-34-2
- PubChem CID: 6324659
- DrugBank: DB00212
- ChemSpider: 4884377
- UNII: LC7FBL96A4
- KEGG: D09038
- ChEBI: CHEBI:8803
- ChEMBL: ChEMBL31601
- CompTox Dashboard (EPA): DTXSID60155121

Chemical and physical data
- Formula: C_{33}H_{50}N_{4}O_{6}S
- Molar mass: 630.85 g·mol^{−1}
- 3D model (JSmol): Interactive image
- SMILES: O=S(=O)(C(C)(C)C)C[C@H](C(=O)N[C@H](C(=O)N[C@@H](CC1CCCCC1)[C@@H](O)[C@@H](O)C2CC2)Cc3cnc[nH]3)Cc4ccccc4
- InChI: InChI=1S/C33H50N4O6S/c1-33(2,3)44(42,43)20-25(16-22-10-6-4-7-11-22)31(40)37-28(18-26-19-34-21-35-26)32(41)36-27(17-23-12-8-5-9-13-23)30(39)29(38)24-14-15-24/h4,6-7,10-11,19,21,23-25,27-30,38-39H,5,8-9,12-18,20H2,1-3H3,(H,34,35)(H,36,41)(H,37,40)/t25-,27+,28+,29+,30-/m1/s1; Key:UXIGZRQVLGFTOU-VQXQMPIVSA-N

Remikiren is a renin inhibitor under development for the treatment of hypertension (high blood pressure). It was first developed by Hoffmann–La Roche in 1996.
