= Juxtaglomerular apparatus =

Structure that regulates function of each nephron

- A renal corpuscle, showing the juxtaglomerular apparatus with Juxtaglomerular cells (granular cells), Macula densa cells and, extraglomerular mesangium.

Identifiers
- MeSH: D007606
- FMA: 83599

The juxtaglomerular apparatus (also known as the juxtaglomerular complex) is a structure in the kidney that regulates the function of each nephron, the functional units of the kidney. The juxtaglomerular apparatus is named because it is next to (juxta-) the glomerulus.

The juxtaglomerular apparatus consists of three types of cells:

1. the macula densa, in the distal straight tubule (thick ascending limb of the loop of Henle), after which the distal convoluted tubule begins
2. juxtaglomerular cells (also known as granular cells) which secrete renin
3. extraglomerular mesangial cells

The basal lamina is absent between macula densa and juxtaglomerular cells to allow direct contact between these cells.

== Location ==
The juxtaglomerular apparatus is part of the kidney nephron, next to the glomerulus. It is found between the afferent arteriole and the thick ascending limb of the loop of Henle (distal straight tubule) of the same nephron. This location is critical to its function in regulating renal blood flow and glomerular filtration rate.

== Function ==
=== Juxtaglomerular cells ===
The renin–angiotensin system. It is activated when juxtaglomerular cells are poorly perfused.

Renin is produced by juxtaglomerular cells, also known as granular cells. These cells are similar to epithelium and are located in the tunica media of the afferent arterioles as they enter the glomeruli. The juxtaglomerular cells secrete renin in response to:

- Stimulation of the beta-1 adrenergic receptor
- Decrease in renal perfusion pressure (detected directly by the juxtaglomerular cells)
- Decrease in NaCl concentration at the macula densa, often due to a decrease in glomerular filtration rate

=== Macula densa ===
At the point where the afferent arterioles enter the glomerulus and the efferent arteriole leaves it, the tubule of the nephron touches the arterioles of the glomerulus from which it arose. At this location, in the wall of the last portion of distal straight tubule, there is a modified region of tubular epithelium called the macula densa (Fig. 5 in Kumaran and Hanukoglu 2020). Cells in the macula densa respond to changes in the sodium chloride levels in the distal tubule of the nephron via the tubuloglomerular feedback (TGF) loop. Within the thick ascending limb of the loop of Henle, the distal convoluted tubule begins immediately following the macula densa.

The macula densa's detection of elevated sodium chloride, which leads to a decrease in GFR, is based on the concept of purinergic signaling. An increase in the salt concentration causes several cell signals (e.g. adenosine release) that leads to constriction of the adjacent afferent arteriole. This decreases the amount of blood coming from the afferent arterioles to the glomerular capillaries, and therefore decreases the amount of fluid that goes from the glomerular capillaries into the Bowman's space (the glomerular filtration rate (GFR)).

When there is a decrease in the sodium concentration, less sodium is reabsorbed in the macular densa cells. The cells increase the production of nitric oxide and prostaglandins to vasodilate the afferent arterioles and increase renin release.

=== Extraglomerular mesangial cells ===
Extraglomerular mesangial cells are located in the junction between the afferent and efferent arterioles. These cells have a contractile property similar to vascular smooth muscles and thus play a role in "regulating GFR" by altering the vessel diameter. Renin is also found in these cells.

== Clinical significance ==
Excess secretion of renin by the juxtaglomerular cells can lead to excess activity of the renin–angiotensin system, hypertension and an increase in blood volume. This is not responsive to the usual treatment for essential hypertension, namely medications and lifestyle modification.

One cause of this can be increased renin production due to narrowing of the renal artery, or a juxtaglomerular cell tumor that produces renin. These will lead to secondary hyperaldosteronism, which will cause hypertension, high blood sodium, low blood potassium, and metabolic alkalosis.

== See also ==
- Hyperaldosteronism
- Juxtaglomerular cell tumor
- Kidney
- Myogenic mechanism
- Renal corpuscle
- Tubuloglomerular feedback
