= Prorenin =

Protein that constitutes a precursor for renin

Prorenin (/prəˈriːnɪn/) is a protein that constitutes a precursor for renin, the hormone that activates the renin–angiotensin system, which serves to raise blood pressure. Prorenin is converted into renin by the juxtaglomerular cells, which are specialised smooth muscle cells present mainly in the afferent, but also the efferent, arterioles of the glomerular capillary bed.

Prorenin is a relatively large molecule, weighing approximately 46 KDa.

== History ==
Prorenin was discovered by Eugenie Lumbers in 1971.

== Synthesis ==
In addition to juxtaglomerular cells, prorenin is also synthesised by other organs, such as the adrenal glands, the ovaries, the testis and the pituitary gland, which is why it is found in the plasma of anephric individuals.

== Concentration ==
Blood concentration levels of prorenin are between 5 and 10 times higher than those of renin. There is evidence to suggest that, in diabetes mellitus, prorenin levels are even higher. One study using relatively newer technology found that blood concentrations levels may be several order of magnitude higher than previously believed, and placing it at micrograms rather than nanograms per millilitre.

== Pregnancy ==
Prorenin occurs in very high concentrations in amniotic fluid and amnion. It is secreted in large amounts from the placenta and womb, and from the ovaries.

== Conversion to renin ==
Proprotein convertase 1 converts prorenin into renin, but proprotein convertase 2 does not.

There is no evidence that prorenin can be converted into renin in the circulation. Therefore, the granular (JG) cells seem to be the only source of active renin.
