= Juxtaglomerular cell =

Cell in kidneys that produces & secretes renin

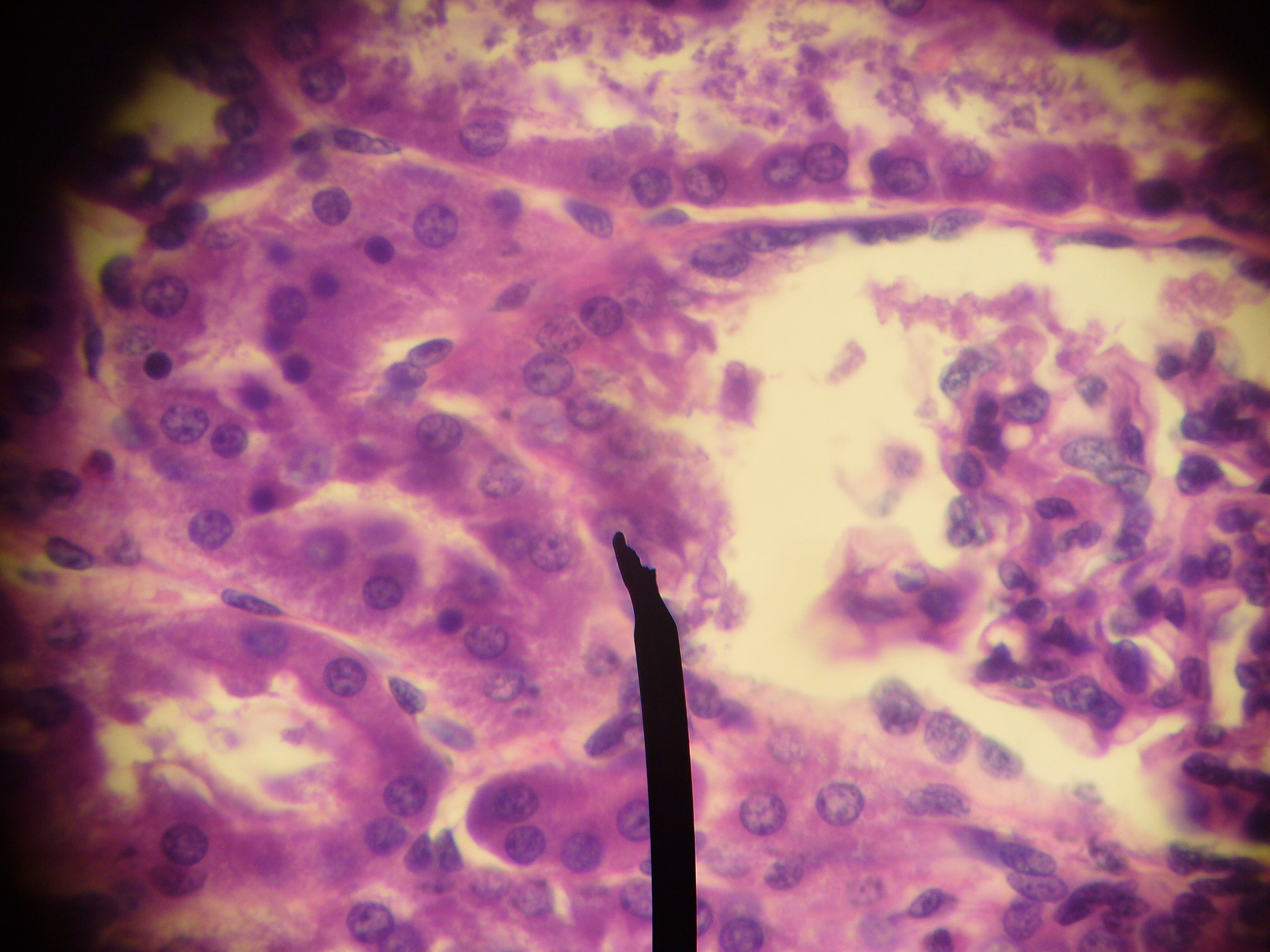
- Microscopic image of juxtaglomerular cells

- Drawing of renal corpuscle showing juxtaglomerular cells (as granular cells, in green), macula densa cells and extraglomerular mesangium.

Identifiers
- FMA: 84138 84138, 84138

Juxtaglomerular cells (JG cells), also known as juxtaglomerular granular cells are cells in the kidney that synthesize, store, and secrete the enzyme renin. They are specialized smooth muscle cells in the tunica media of the walls of the afferent arterioles and – to a lesser extent – efferent arterioles of the glomerulus. They are located near the glomerulus, hence the name. In synthesizing renin, they play a critical role in the renin–angiotensin system and thus in autoregulation of the kidney.

Juxtaglomerular cells secrete renin in response to a drop in pressure detected by stretch receptors in the vascular walls, or when stimulated by macula densa cells. Macula densa cells are located in the distal convoluted tubule, and stimulate juxtaglomerular cells to release renin when they detect a drop in chloride concentration in tubular fluid. Together, juxtaglomerular cells, extraglomerular mesangial cells and macula densa cells comprise the juxtaglomerular apparatus.

In appropriately stained tissue sections, juxtaglomerular cells are distinguished by their granulated cytoplasm.

JG cells possess abundant sympathetic innervation; similar to cardiac tissue, juxtaglomerular cells harbor β1 adrenergic receptors. When stimulated by epinephrine or norepinephrine, these receptors induce the secretion of renin. These cells also respond directly to a decrease in systemic blood pressure which is manifested as a lower renal perfusion pressure.

== Histology ==
JG cells exhibit round cell nuclei (rather than elongated ones). JG cells contain renin-containing granules as well as small amounts of angiotensin-converting enzyme, and angiotensin I and II.

== See also ==
- Juxtaglomerular cell tumor
- Juxtaglomerular apparatus
- List of distinct cell types in the adult human body
- List of human cell types derived from the germ layers
