= Angiotensin =

Group of peptide hormones in mammals

AGT

Identifiers
- Aliases: AGT, ANHU, SERPINA8, hFLT1, angiotensinogen
- External IDs: MGI: 87963; GeneCards: AGT
Available structures
PDB	Ortholog search: PDBe RCSB
PDB	List of PDB id codes 2WXW, 2X0B, 4APH,%%s1N9U, 1N9V,%%s1N9V, 1N9U, 3CK0, 4AA1, 4APH, 5E2Q

Gene location (Human)
Chr.	Chromosome 1 (human)
Band	1q42.2	Start	230,690,776 bp
Band	1q42.2	End	230,745,576 bp

Gene location (Mouse)
Chr.	Chromosome 8 (mouse)
Band	8 E2|8 72.81 cM	Start	125,283,273 bp
Band	8 E2|8 72.81 cM	End	125,296,445 bp
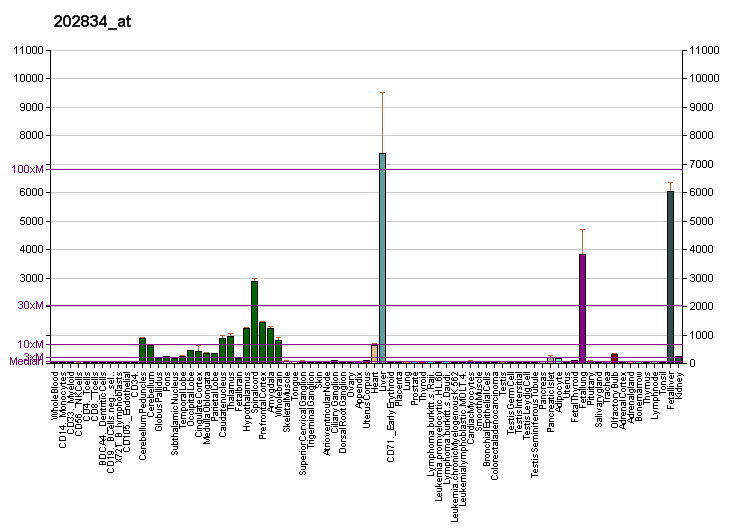
RNA expression pattern
Bgee	Human / Mouse (ortholog); Top expressed in: liver; right lobe of liver; external globus pallidus; dorsal motor nucleus of vagus nerve; superior vestibular nucleus; pars reticulata; paraflocculus of cerebellum; inferior olivary nucleus; ventral tegmental area; amygdala / Top expressed in: left lobe of liver; parotid gland; lumbar subsegment of spinal cord; paraventricular nucleus of hypothalamus; central gray substance of midbrain; deep cerebellar nuclei; dorsal tegmental nucleus; superior colliculus; globus pallidus; medulla oblongata; More reference expression data
BioGPS	More reference expression data
Gene ontology
Molecular function	protein binding; serine-type endopeptidase inhibitor activity; type 1 angiotensin receptor binding; hormone activity; superoxide-generating NADPH oxidase activator activity; growth factor activity; type 2 angiotensin receptor binding; sodium channel regulator activity; angiotensin receptor binding; receptor ligand activity
Cellular component	cytoplasm; extracellular exosome; blood microparticle; extracellular space; cytosol; extracellular region; collagen-containing extracellular matrix
Biological process	uterine smooth muscle contraction; renal system process; vasoconstriction; positive regulation of catalytic activity; positive regulation of cardiac muscle hypertrophy; cell surface receptor signaling pathway; cellular response to mechanical stimulus; stress-activated MAPK cascade; artery smooth muscle contraction; regulation of systemic arterial blood pressure by renin-angiotensin; regulation of apoptotic process; negative regulation of neurotrophin TRK receptor signaling pathway; regulation of long-term neuronal synaptic plasticity; positive regulation of renal sodium excretion; positive regulation of fibroblast proliferation; cellular sodium ion homeostasis; ERK1 and ERK2 cascade; activation of phospholipase C activity; angiotensin maturation; positive regulation of extracellular matrix constituent secretion; positive regulation of blood pressure; negative regulation of cell growth; regulation of norepinephrine secretion; female pregnancy; negative regulation of tissue remodeling; regulation of heart rate; smooth muscle cell proliferation; regulation of calcium ion transport; regulation of transmission of nerve impulse; cell growth involved in cardiac muscle cell development; response to muscle activity involved in regulation of muscle adaptation; positive regulation of nitric oxide biosynthetic process; angiotensin-mediated drinking behavior; cell-cell signaling; ageing; vasodilation; positive regulation of cell population proliferation; fibroblast proliferation; negative regulation of angiogenesis; positive regulation of superoxide anion generation; positive regulation of L-lysine import across plasma membrane; positive regulation of cardiac muscle cell apoptotic process; positive regulation of vascular associated smooth muscle cell proliferation; positive regulation of cytosolic calcium ion concentration; negative regulation of endopeptidase activity; positive regulation of vascular associated smooth muscle cell migration; regulation of molecular function; regulation of lipid metabolic process; positive regulation of L-arginine import across plasma membrane; regulation of signaling receptor activity; positive regulation of neuron projection development; response to estradiol; cellular response to angiotensin; protein import into nucleus; associative learning; operant conditioning; positive regulation of insulin receptor signaling pathway; regulation of extracellular matrix assembly; positive regulation of cholesterol esterification; phospholipase C-activating G protein-coupled receptor signaling pathway; blood vessel remodeling; positive regulation of reactive oxygen species metabolic process; positive regulation of extrinsic apoptotic signaling pathway; positive regulation of protein metabolic process; positive regulation of branching involved in ureteric bud morphogenesis; kidney development; positive regulation of transcription, DNA-templated; positive regulation of peptidyl-tyrosine phosphorylation; positive regulation of inflammatory response; positive regulation of protein tyrosine kinase activity; regulation of blood pressure; positive regulation of macrophage derived foam cell differentiation; regulation of vasoconstriction; positive regulation of NF-kappaB transcription factor activity; positive regulation of NAD(P)H oxidase activity; nitric oxide mediated signal transduction; G protein-coupled receptor signaling pathway coupled to cGMP nucleotide second messenger; positive regulation of epidermal growth factor receptor signaling pathway; regulation of blood volume by renin-angiotensin; regulation of cardiac conduction; maintenance of blood vessel diameter homeostasis by renin-angiotensin; regulation of renal sodium excretion; positive regulation of cytokine production; positive regulation of membrane hyperpolarization; negative regulation of sodium ion transmembrane transporter activity; renin-angiotensin regulation of aldosterone production; positive regulation of endothelial cell migration; low-density lipoprotein particle remodeling; regulation of cell population proliferation; regulation of cell growth; positive regulation of gap junction assembly; positive regulation of phosphatidylinositol 3-kinase signaling; angiotensin-activated signaling pathway; negative regulation of gene expression; regulation of renal output by angiotensin; positive regulation of activation of Janus kinase activity; G protein-coupled receptor signaling pathway
Sources:Amigo / QuickGO
Orthologs
Databases	NCBI: entry; OMA: entry
Species	Human	Mouse
Entrez	183	11606
Ensembl	ENSG00000135744	ENSMUSG00000031980
UniProt	P01019	P11859; Q3UTR7
RefSeq (mRNA)	NM_000029; NM_001382817; NM_001384479	NM_007428
RefSeq (protein)	NP_000020; NP_001369746	NP_031454
Location (UCSC)	Chr 1: 230.69 – 230.75 Mb	Chr 8: 125.28 – 125.3 Mb
PubMed search
- Wikidata
View/Edit Human	View/Edit Mouse

Angiotensin is a peptide hormone that causes vasoconstriction and an increase in blood pressure. It is part of the renin–angiotensin system, which regulates blood pressure. Angiotensin also stimulates the release of aldosterone from the adrenal cortex to promote sodium retention by the kidneys.

An oligopeptide, angiotensin is a hormone and a dipsogen. It is derived from the precursor molecule angiotensinogen, a serum globulin produced in the liver. Angiotensin was isolated in the late 1930s (first named "angiotonin" or "hypertensin", later renamed "angiotensin" as a consensus by the 2 groups that independently discovered it) and subsequently characterized and synthesized by groups at the Cleveland Clinic and Ciba laboratories.

== Precursor and types ==
=== Angiotensinogen ===
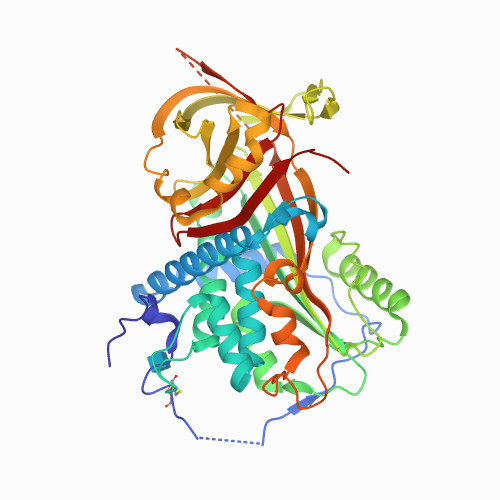
Crystal structure of reactive center loop cleaved angiotensinogen via x-ray diffraction

Angiotensinogen is an α-2-globulin synthesized in the liver and is a precursor for angiotensin, but has also been indicated as having many other roles not related to angiotensin peptides. It is a member of the serpin family of proteins, leading to another name: Serpin A8, although it is not known to inhibit other enzymes like most serpins. In addition, a generalized crystal structure can be estimated by examining other proteins of the serpin family, but angiotensinogen has an elongated N-terminus compared to other serpin family proteins. Obtaining actual crystals for X-ray diffractometric analysis is difficult in part due to the variability of glycosylation that angiotensinogen exhibits. The non-glycosylated and fully glycosylated states of angiotensinogen also vary in molecular weight, the former weighing 53 kDa and the latter weighing 75 kDa, with a plethora of partially glycosylated states weighing in between these two values.

Angiotensinogen is also known as renin substrate. It is cleaved at the N-terminus by renin to result in angiotensin I, which will later be modified to become angiotensin II. This peptide is 485 amino acids long, and 10 N-terminus amino acids are cleaved when renin acts on it. The first 12 amino acids are the most important for activity.

Amino acid sequence: Asp-Arg-Val-Tyr-Ile-His-Pro-Phe-His-Leu-Val-Ile-...

Plasma angiotensinogen levels are increased by plasma corticosteroid, estrogen, thyroid hormone, and angiotensin II levels. In mice with a full body deficit of angiotensinogen, the effects observed were low newborn survival rate, stunted body weight gain, stunted growth, and abnormal renal development.

=== Angiotensin I ===
Amino acid sequence: Asp-Arg-Val-Tyr-Ile-His-Pro-Phe-His-Leu | Val-Ile-...

Renin–angiotensin–aldosterone system

Angiotensin I (CAS# 11128-99-7), officially called proangiotensin, is formed by the action of renin on angiotensinogen. Renin cleaves the peptide bond between the leucine (Leu) and valine (Val) residues on angiotensinogen, creating the decapeptide (ten amino acid) (des-Asp) angiotensin I. Renin is produced in the kidneys in response to renal sympathetic activity, decreased intrarenal blood pressure (<90 mmHg systolic blood pressure ) at the juxtaglomerular cells, dehydration or decreased delivery of Na^{+} and Cl^{-} to the macula densa. If a reduced NaCl concentration in the distal tubule is sensed by the macula densa, renin release by juxtaglomerular cells is increased. This sensing mechanism for macula densa-mediated renin secretion appears to have a specific dependency on chloride ions rather than sodium ions. Studies using isolated preparations of thick ascending limb with glomerulus attached in low NaCl perfusate were unable to inhibit renin secretion when various sodium salts were added but could inhibit renin secretion with the addition of chloride salts. This, and similar findings obtained in vivo, has led some to believe that perhaps "the initiating signal for MD control of renin secretion is a change in the rate of NaCl uptake predominantly via a luminal Na,K,2Cl co-transporter whose physiological activity is determined by a change in luminal Cl^{-} concentration."

Angiotensin I appears to have no direct biological activity and exists solely as a precursor to angiotensin II.

=== Angiotensin II ===
Amino acid sequence: Asp-Arg-Val-Tyr-Ile-His-Pro-Phe

==== Production ====
Angiotensin I is converted to angiotensin II (AII) through removal of two C-terminal residues by the enzyme angiotensin-converting enzyme (ACE), primarily through ACE within the lung (but also present in endothelial cells, kidney epithelial cells, and the brain).

"This conversion reduces the peptide from ten amino acids (angiotensin I) to eight amino acids (angiotensin II), with the removal of the terminal His-Leu dipeptide by ACE."

==== Degradation ====
Angiotensin II is degraded to angiotensin III by angiotensinases located in red blood cells and the vascular beds of most tissues. Angiotensin II has a half-life in circulation of around 30 seconds, whereas, in tissue, it may be as long as 15–30 minutes. Other cleavage products of ACE, seven or nine amino acids long, are also known; they have differential affinity for angiotensin receptors, although their exact role is still unclear.

==== Physiological effects ====
Angiotensin II exhibits endocrine, autocrine/paracrine, and intracrine functions.

It promotes aldosterone release from the adrenal cortex, as well as arginine vasopressin release from the posterior pituitary.

It acts directly upon the proximal tubules of the kidney to regulate water and Na+ reabsorption, promoting reabsorption at very low concentrations while increasingly inhibiting reabsorption with increasing concentrations. In the proximal tubule, it promotes Na^{+} reabsorption and H^{+} excretion (which is coupled to bicarbonate reabsorption) by the Na^{+}/H^{+} exchanger.

It causes venous and arterial vasoconstriction by a G_{q} alpha subunit-coupled receptor upon vascular smooth muscle cells (with downstream IP3-dependent mechanism causing a rise in intracellular Ca^{2+} to effect smooth muscle excitation-contraction coupling), thus acting to increase blood pressure.

==== Pharmacological significance ====
ACE is a pharmaceutical target of ACE inhibitor drugs, which decrease the rate of conversion of angiotensin I to angiotensin II, and of angiotensin II receptor antagonists which block angiotensin II AT_{1} receptors.

Angiotensin II results in increased inotropy, chronotropy, catecholamine and sensitivity, aldosterone levels, vasopressin levels, and cardiac remodeling and vasoconstriction through AT_{1} receptors on peripheral vessels (conversely, AT_{2} receptors impair cardiac remodeling). This is why ACE inhibitors and ARBs help to prevent remodeling that occurs secondary to angiotensin II and are beneficial in congestive heart failure.

=== Angiotensin III ===
Amino acid sequence: Asp | Arg-Val-Tyr-Ile-His-Pro-Phe

Angiotensin III, along with angiotensin II, is considered an active peptide derived from angiotensinogen. It is formed by removing an amino acid from angiotensin II by glutamyl aminopeptidase A, which cleaves the N-terminal Asp residue.

Angiotensin III has 40% of the pressor activity of angiotensin II, but 100% of the aldosterone-producing activity. It increases mean arterial pressure.

Activation of the AT2 receptor by angiotensin III triggers natriuresis, while AT2 activation via angiotensin II does not. This natriuretic response via angiotensin III occurs when the AT1 receptor is blocked.

=== Angiotensin IV ===
Amino acid sequence: Arg | Val-Tyr-Ile-His-Pro-Phe

Angiotensin IV is a hexapeptide that, like angiotensin III, has some lesser activity. Angiotensin IV has a wide range of activities in the central nervous system.

The exact identity of AT4 receptors has not been established. There is evidence that the AT4 receptor is insulin-regulated aminopeptidase (IRAP). There is also evidence that angiotensin IV interacts with the HGF system through the c-Met receptor.

Synthetic small molecule analogues of angiotensin IV with the ability to penetrate through blood brain barrier have been developed.

The AT4 site may be involved in memory acquisition and recall, as well as blood flow regulation. Angiotensin IV and its analogs may also benefit spatial memory tasks such as object recognition and avoidance (conditioned and passive avoidance). Studies have also shown that the usual biological effects of angiotensin IV on the body are not affected by common AT2 receptor antagonists such as the hypertension medication losartan.

== Effects ==
See also Angiotensin#Effects

Angiotensins II, III and IV have a number of effects throughout the body:

=== Adipic ===
Angiotensins "modulate fat mass expansion through upregulation of adipose tissue lipogenesis ... and downregulation of lipolysis."

=== Cardiovascular ===
Angiotensins are potent direct vasoconstrictors, constricting arteries and increasing blood pressure. This effect is achieved through activation of the GPCR AT_{1}, which signals through a G_{q} protein to activate phospholipase C, and subsequently increase intracellular calcium.

Angiotensin II has prothrombotic potential through adhesion and aggregation of platelets and stimulation of PAI-1 and PAI-2.

=== Neural ===
Angiotensin II increases thirst sensation (dipsogen) through the area postrema and subfornical organ of the brain, decreases the response of the baroreceptor reflex, increases the desire for salt, increases secretion of ADH from the posterior pituitary, and increases secretion of ACTH from the anterior pituitary. Some evidence suggests that it acts on the organum vasculosum of the lamina terminalis (OVLT) as well.

=== Adrenal ===
Angiotensin II acts on the adrenal cortex, causing it to release aldosterone, a hormone that causes the kidneys to retain sodium and lose potassium. Elevated plasma angiotensin II levels are responsible for the elevated aldosterone levels present during the luteal phase of the menstrual cycle.

=== Renal ===
Angiotensin II has a direct effect on the proximal tubules to increase Na^{+} reabsorption. It has a complex and variable effect on glomerular filtration and renal blood flow depending on the setting. Increases in systemic blood pressure will maintain renal perfusion pressure; however, constriction of the afferent and efferent glomerular arterioles will tend to restrict renal blood flow. The effect on the efferent arteriolar resistance is, however, markedly greater, in part due to its smaller basal diameter; this tends to increase glomerular capillary hydrostatic pressure and maintain glomerular filtration rate. A number of other mechanisms can affect renal blood flow and GFR. High concentrations of Angiotensin II can constrict the glomerular mesangium, reducing the area for glomerular filtration. Angiotensin II is a sensitizer to tubuloglomerular feedback, preventing an excessive rise in GFR. Angiotensin II causes the local release of prostaglandins, which, in turn, antagonize renal vasoconstriction. The net effect of these competing mechanisms on glomerular filtration will vary with the physiological and pharmacological environment.

Direct Renal effects of angiotensin II (not including aldosterone release)
Target	Action	Mechanism
renal artery & afferent arterioles	vasoconstriction (weaker)	VDCCs → Ca^{2+} influx
efferent arteriole	vasoconstriction (stronger)	(probably) activate Angiotensin receptor 1 → Activation of G_{q} → ↑PLC activity → ↑IP_{3} and DAG → activation of IP_{3} receptor in SR → ↑intracellular Ca^{2+}
mesangial cells	contraction → ↓filtration area	activation of G_{q} → ↑PLC activity → ↑IP_{3} and DAG → activation of IP_{3} receptor in SR → ↑intracellular Ca^{2+}; VDCCs → Ca^{2+} influx
proximal tubule	increased Na^{+} reabsorption	adjustment of Starling forces in peritubular capillaries to favour increased reabsorption; efferent and afferent arteriole contraction → decreased hydrostatic pressure in peritubular capillaries; efferent arteriole contraction → increased filtration fraction → increased colloid osmotic pressure in peritubular capillaries; increased sodium–hydrogen antiporter activity
tubuloglomerular feedback	increased sensitivity	increase in afferent arteriole responsiveness to signals from macula densa
medullary blood flow	reduction	

== See also ==
- ACE inhibitor
- Angiotensin receptor
- Angiotensin II receptor antagonist
- Captopril
- Perindopril
- Renin inhibitor
