= Renin =

Aspartic protease protein and enzyme

REN
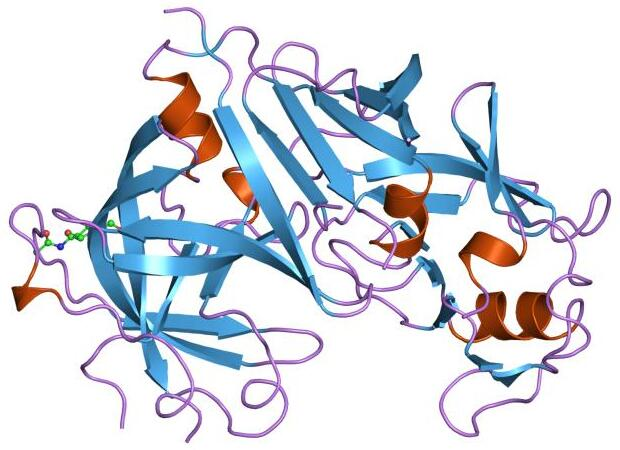

Identifiers
- Aliases: REN, HNFJ2, renin, ADTKD4, RTD
- External IDs: OMIM: 179820; MGI: 97898; GeneCards: REN
Available structures
PDB	Ortholog search: PDBe RCSB
PDB	List of PDB id codes 4XX4, 1BBS, 1BIL, 1BIM, 1HRN, 1RNE, 2BKS, 2BKT, 2FS4, 2G1N, 2G1O, 2G1R, 2G1S, 2G1Y, 2G20, 2G21, 2G22, 2G24, 2G26, 2G27, 2I4Q, 2IKO, 2IKU, 2IL2, 2REN, 2V0Z, 2V10, 2V11, 2V12, 2V13, 2V16, 2X0B, 3D91, 3G6Z, 3G70, 3G72, 3GW5, 3K1W, 3KM4, 3O9L, 3OAD, 3OAG, 3OOT, 3OQF, 3OQK, 3OWN, 3Q3T, 3Q4B, 3Q5H, 3SFC, 3VCM, 3VSW, 3VSX, 3VUC, 3VYD, 3VYE, 3VYF, 4AMT, 4GJ5, 4GJ6, 4GJ7, 4GJ8, 4GJ9, 4GJA, 4GJB, 4GJC, 4GJD, 4PYV, 4Q1N, 4RYC, 4RYG, 4RZ1, 4S1G, 4XX3
Enzyme activity
EC #	BRENDA	ExPASy	KEGG	MetaCyc
3.4.23.15	↗	↗	↗	↗

Gene location (Human)
Chr.	Chromosome 1 (human)
Band	1q32.1	Start	204,154,819 bp
Band	1q32.1	End	204,190,324 bp
RNA expression pattern
Bgee	Human / Mouse (ortholog); Top expressed in: decidua; human kidney; stromal cell of endometrium; left ovary; testicle; right ovary; renal cortex; metanephros; metanephric glomerulus; body of uterus / n/a; More reference expression data
BioGPS	n/a
Gene ontology
Molecular function	insulin-like growth factor receptor binding; aspartic-type endopeptidase activity; endopeptidase activity; peptidase activity; signaling receptor binding; hydrolase activity; protein binding
Cellular component	cytoplasm; membrane; plasma membrane; intracellular anatomical structure; extracellular region; extracellular space; apical part of cell
Biological process	response to immobilization stress; regulation of blood volume by renin-angiotensin; male gonad development; regulation of MAPK cascade; kidney development; renin-angiotensin regulation of aldosterone production; cell maturation; amyloid-beta metabolic process; response to organic substance; angiotensin maturation; proteolysis; mesonephros development; regulation of blood pressure; response to lipopolysaccharide; protein catabolic process; drinking behavior; hormone-mediated signaling pathway; response to cGMP; response to cAMP
Sources:Amigo / QuickGO
Orthologs
Databases	NCBI: entry; OMA: entry
Species	Human	Mouse
Entrez	5972	19701
Ensembl	ENSG00000143839	ENSMUSG00000070645
UniProt	P00797	P06281
RefSeq (mRNA)	NM_000537	NM_031192
RefSeq (protein)	NP_000528	NP_112469
Location (UCSC)	Chr 1: 204.15 – 204.19 Mb	n/a
PubMed search
- Wikidata
View/Edit Human	View/Edit Mouse

renin

Identifiers
- EC no.: 3.4.23.15
- CAS no.: 9015-94-5

Databases
- BRENDA: enzyme data
- ExPASy: NiceZyme view
- KEGG: enzyme entry
- MetaCyc: metabolic pathway
- Rhea: reactions
- PDB structures: RCSB PDB PDBe PDBsum
- Gene Ontology: AmiGO / QuickGO
Search
- PMC: articles
- PubMed: articles
- NCBI: proteins

Renin (etymology and pronunciation), also known as an angiotensinogenase, is an aspartic protease protein and enzyme secreted by the kidneys that participates in the body's renin–angiotensin–aldosterone system (RAAS), which increases the volume of extracellular fluid (blood plasma, lymph, and interstitial fluid) and causes arterial vasoconstriction. Thus, it increases the body's mean arterial blood pressure.

Renin is not commonly referred to as a hormone, although it has a receptor, the (pro)renin receptor, also known as the renin receptor and prorenin receptor (see also below), as well as enzymatic activity with which it hydrolyzes angiotensinogen to angiotensin I.

== Biochemistry and physiology ==
=== Structure ===
The primary structure of renin precursor consists of 406 amino acids with a pre- and a pro-segment carrying 20 and 46 amino acids, respectively. Mature renin contains 340 amino acids and has a mass of 37 kDa.

=== Secretion ===
The enzyme renin is secreted by pericytes in the vicinity of the afferent arterioles and similar microvessels of the kidney from specialized cells of the juxtaglomerular apparatus—the juxtaglomerular cells, in response to three stimuli:

1. A decrease in arterial blood pressure (that could be related to a decrease in blood volume) as detected by baroreceptors (pressure-sensitive cells). This is the most direct causal link between blood pressure and renin secretion (the other two methods operate via longer pathways).
2. A decrease in sodium load delivered to the distal tubule. This load is measured by the macula densa of the juxtaglomerular apparatus.
3. Sympathetic nervous system activity, which also controls blood pressure, acting through the β_{1} adrenergic receptors.

Human renin is secreted by at least two cellular pathways: a constitutive pathway for the secretion of the precursor prorenin and a regulated pathway for the secretion of mature renin.

=== Renin–angiotensin system ===
The renin–angiotensin system, showing role of renin at bottom

The renin enzyme circulates in the bloodstream and hydrolyzes (breaks down) angiotensinogen secreted from the liver into the peptide angiotensin I.

Angiotensin I is further cleaved in the lungs by endothelial-bound angiotensin-converting enzyme (ACE) into angiotensin II, the most vasoactive peptide. Angiotensin II is a potent constrictor of all blood vessels. It acts on the smooth muscle and, therefore, raises the resistance posed by these arteries to the heart, and so for the same cardiac output, the blood pressure will rise.

Angiotensin II also acts on the adrenal glands and releases aldosterone, which stimulates the epithelial cells in the distal tubule and collecting ducts of the kidneys to increase re-absorption of sodium, exchanging with potassium to maintain electrochemical neutrality, and water, leading to raised blood volume and raised blood pressure.

The RAS also acts on the CNS to increase water intake by stimulating thirst, as well as conserving blood volume, by reducing urinary loss through the secretion of vasopressin from the posterior pituitary gland.

The normal concentration of renin in adult human plasma is 1.98–24.6 ng/L in the upright position.

== Function ==
Renin activates the renin–angiotensin system by using its endopeptidase activity to cleave the peptide bonds between leucine and valine residues in angiotensinogen, produced by the liver, to yield angiotensin I, which is further converted into angiotensin II by ACE, the angiotensin–converting enzyme primarily within the capillaries of the lungs. Angiotensin II then constricts blood vessels, increases the secretion of ADH and aldosterone, and stimulates the hypothalamus to activate the thirst reflex, each leading to an increase in blood pressure. Renin's primary function is therefore to eventually cause an increase in blood pressure, leading to restoration of perfusion pressure in the kidneys.

Renin is secreted from juxtaglomerular kidney cells, which sense changes in renal perfusion pressure, via stretch receptors in the vascular walls. The juxtaglomerular cells are also stimulated to release renin by signaling from the macula densa. The macula densa senses changes in sodium delivery to the distal tubule, and responds to a drop in tubular sodium load by stimulating renin release in the juxtaglomerular cells. Together, the macula densa and juxtaglomerular cells comprise the juxtaglomerular complex.

Renin secretion is also stimulated by sympathetic nervous stimulation, mainly through β_{1} adrenoreceptor activation.

The (pro)renin receptor to which renin and prorenin bind is encoded by the gene ATP6ap2, ATPase H(+)-transporting lysosomal accessory protein 2, which results in a fourfold increase in the conversion of angiotensinogen to angiotensin I over that shown by soluble renin as well as non-hydrolytic activation of prorenin via a conformational change in prorenin which exposes the catalytic site to angiotensinogen substrate. In addition, renin and prorenin binding results in phosphorylation of serine and tyrosine residues of ATP6AP2.

The level of renin mRNA appears to be modulated by the binding of HADHB, HuR and CP1 to a regulatory region in the 3' UTR.

== Genetics ==
The gene for renin, REN, spans 12 kb of DNA and contains 8 introns. It produces several mRNA that encode different REN isoforms.

Mutations in the REN gene can be inherited, and are a cause of a rare inherited kidney disease, so far found to be present in only 2 families. This disease is autosomal dominant, meaning that it is characterized by a 50% chance of inheritance and is a slowly progressive chronic kidney disease that leads to the need for dialysis or kidney transplantation. Many—but not all—patients and families with this disease have an elevation in serum potassium and unexplained anemia relatively early in life. Patients with a mutation in this gene can have a variable rate of loss of kidney function, with some individuals going on dialysis in their 40s while others may not go on dialysis until into their 70s. This is a rare inherited kidney disease that exists in less than 1% of people with kidney disease.

== Clinical applications ==
An over-active renin-angiotensin system leads to vasoconstriction and retention of sodium and water. These effects lead to hypertension. Therefore, renin inhibitors can be used for the treatment of hypertension. This is measured by the plasma renin activity (PRA).

In current medical practice, the renin–angiotensin–aldosterone system's overactivity (and resultant hypertension) is more commonly reduced using either ACE inhibitors (such as ramipril and perindopril) or angiotensin II receptor blockers (ARBs, such as losartan, irbesartan or candesartan) rather than a direct oral renin inhibitor. ACE inhibitors or ARBs are also part of the standard treatment after a heart attack.

The differential diagnosis of kidney cancer in a young patient with hypertension includes juxtaglomerular cell tumor (reninoma), Wilms' tumor, and renal cell carcinoma, all of which may produce renin.

=== Measurement ===
Renin is usually measured as the plasma renin activity (PRA). PRA is measured specially in case of certain diseases that present with hypertension or hypotension. PRA is also raised in certain tumors. A PRA measurement may be compared to a plasma aldosterone concentration (PAC) as a PAC/PRA ratio.

== Discovery and naming ==
The name renin = ren + -in, "kidney" + "compound". The most common pronunciation in English is /ˈriːnɪn/ (long e); /ˈrɛnɪn/ (short e) is also common, but using /ˈriːnɪn/ allows one to reserve /ˈrɛnɪn/ for rennin. Renin was discovered, characterized, and named in 1898 by Robert Tigerstedt, Professor of Physiology, and his student, Per Bergman, at the Karolinska Institute in Stockholm.

== See also ==
- Angiotensin-converting enzyme
- Plasma renin activity
- Renin inhibitor
- Renin stability regulatory element (REN-SRE)
