= Renin–angiotensin system =

Hormone system

Anatomical diagram of RAS

The renin–angiotensin system (RAS), or renin–angiotensin–aldosterone system (RAAS), is a hormone system that regulates blood pressure / fluid / electrolyte balance, and systemic vascular resistance.

When renal blood flow is reduced, juxtaglomerular cells in the kidneys convert the precursor prorenin (already present in the blood) into renin and secrete it directly into the circulation. Plasma renin then carries out the conversion of angiotensinogen, released by the liver, to angiotensin I, which has no biological function on its own. Angiotensin I is subsequently converted to the active angiotensin II by the angiotensin-converting enzyme (ACE) found on the surface of vascular endothelial cells, predominantly those of the lungs. Angiotensin II has a short life of about 1 to 2 minutes. Then, it is rapidly degraded into angiotensin III by angiotensinases which are present in red blood cells and vascular beds in many tissues.

Angiotensin III increases blood pressure and stimulates aldosterone secretion from the adrenal cortex; it has 100% of the adrenocortical stimulating activity and 40% of the vasopressor activity of angiotensin II. Angiotensin IV also has adrenocortical and vasopressor activities.

Angiotensin II is a potent vasoconstrictive peptide that causes blood vessels to narrow, resulting in increased blood pressure. Angiotensin II also stimulates the secretion of the hormone aldosterone from the adrenal cortex. Aldosterone causes the renal tubules to increase the reabsorption of sodium which in consequence causes the reabsorption of water into the blood, while at the same time causing the excretion of potassium (to maintain electrolyte balance). This increases the volume of extracellular fluid in the body, which also increases blood pressure.

If the RAS is abnormally active, blood pressure will be too high. There are several types of drugs that affect the RAS, which include ACE inhibitors, angiotensin II receptor blockers (ARBs), and renin inhibitors that interrupt different steps in this system to improve blood pressure. These drugs are one of the primary ways to control high blood pressure, heart failure, kidney failure, and the harmful effects of diabetes.

== Activation ==
RAAS schematic

The system can be activated when there is a loss of blood volume or a drop in blood pressure (such as in hemorrhage or dehydration). This loss of pressure is interpreted by baroreceptors in the carotid sinus. It can also be activated by a decrease in the filtrate sodium chloride (NaCl) concentration or a decreased filtrate flow rate that will stimulate the macula densa to signal the juxtaglomerular cells to release renin.

1. If the perfusion of the juxtaglomerular apparatus in the kidney's macula densa decreases, then the juxtaglomerular cells (granular cells, modified pericytes in the glomerular capillary) release the enzyme renin.
2. Renin cleaves a decapeptide from angiotensinogen, a globular protein. The decapeptide is known as angiotensin I.
3. Angiotensin I is then converted to an octapeptide, angiotensin II by angiotensin-converting enzyme (ACE), which is thought to be found mainly in endothelial cells of the capillaries throughout the body, within the lungs and the epithelial cells of the kidneys. One study in 1992 found ACE in all blood vessel endothelial cells.
4. Angiotensin II is the major bioactive product of the renin–angiotensin system, binding to receptors on intraglomerular mesangial cells, causing these cells to contract along with the blood vessels surrounding them; and to receptors on the zona glomerulosa cells, causing the release of aldosterone from the zona glomerulosa in the adrenal cortex. Angiotensin II acts as an endocrine, autocrine/paracrine, and intracrine hormone.

== Cardiovascular effects ==
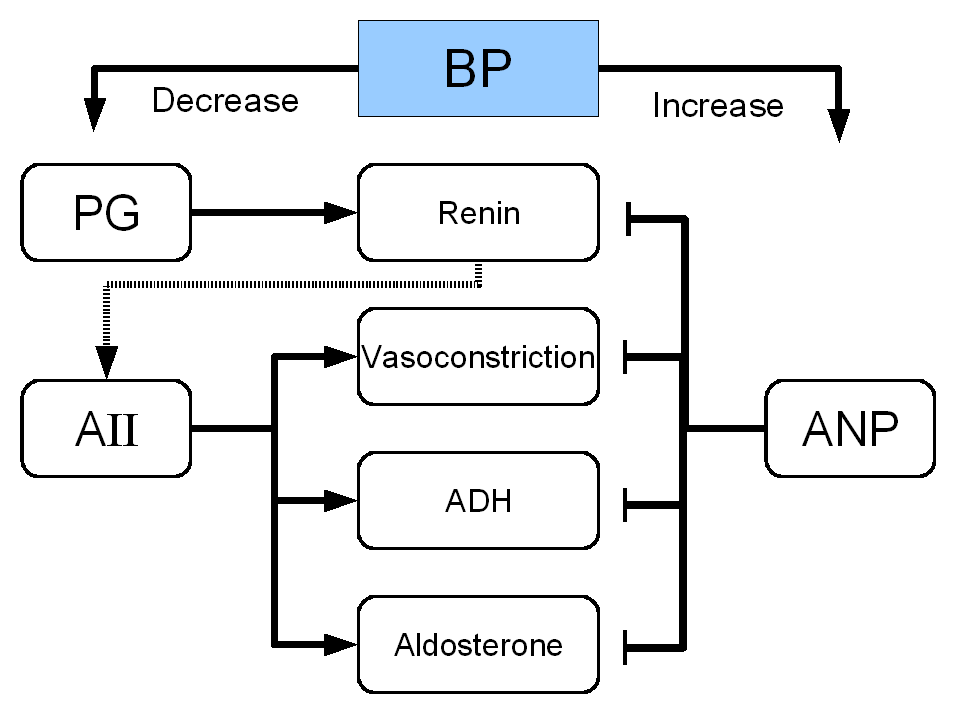
Renal hormone regulation schematic

Angiotensin I may have some minor activity, but angiotensin II is the major bioactive product. Angiotensin II has a variety of effects on the body:

- Throughout the body, angiotensin II is a potent vasoconstrictor of arterioles.
- In the kidneys, angiotensin II constricts glomerular arterioles, having a greater effect on efferent arterioles than afferent. As with most other capillary beds in the body, the constriction of afferent arterioles increases the arteriolar resistance, raising systemic arterial blood pressure and decreasing the blood flow. However, the kidneys must continue to filter enough blood despite this drop in blood flow, necessitating mechanisms to keep glomerular blood pressure up. To do this, angiotensin II constricts efferent arterioles, which forces blood to build up in the glomerulus, increasing glomerular pressure. The glomerular filtration rate (GFR) is thus maintained, and blood filtration can continue despite lowered overall kidney blood flow. Because the filtration fraction, which is the ratio of the glomerular filtration rate (GFR) to the renal plasma flow (RPF), has increased, there is less plasma fluid in the downstream peritubular capillaries. This in turn leads to a decreased hydrostatic pressure and increased oncotic pressure (due to unfiltered plasma proteins) in the peritubular capillaries. The effect of decreased hydrostatic pressure and increased oncotic pressure in the peritubular capillaries will facilitate increased reabsorption of tubular fluid.
- Angiotensin II decreases medullary blood flow through the vasa recta. This decreases the washout of NaCl and urea in the kidney medullary space. Thus, higher concentrations of NaCl and urea in the medulla facilitate increased absorption of tubular fluid. Furthermore, increased reabsorption of fluid into the medulla will increase passive reabsorption of sodium along the thick ascending limb of the Loop of Henle.
- Angiotensin II stimulates Na^{+}/H^{+} exchangers located on the apical membranes (faces the tubular lumen) of cells in the proximal tubule and thick ascending limb of the loop of Henle in addition to Na^{+} channels in the collecting ducts. This will ultimately lead to increased sodium reabsorption.
- Angiotensin II stimulates the hypertrophy of renal tubule cells, leading to further sodium reabsorption.
- In the adrenal cortex, angiotensin II acts to cause the release of aldosterone. Aldosterone acts on the tubules (e.g., the distal convoluted tubules and the cortical collecting ducts) in the kidneys, causing them to reabsorb more sodium and water from the urine. This increases blood volume and, therefore, increases blood pressure. In exchange for the reabsorbing of sodium to blood, potassium is secreted into the tubules, becomes part of urine and is excreted.
- Angiotensin II causes the release of anti-diuretic hormone (ADH), also called vasopressin – ADH is made in the hypothalamus and released from the posterior pituitary gland. As its name suggests, it also exhibits vaso-constrictive properties, but its main course of action is to stimulate reabsorption of water in the kidneys. ADH also acts on the central nervous system to increase an individual's appetite for salt, and to stimulate the sensation of thirst.

These effects directly act together to increase blood pressure and are opposed by atrial natriuretic peptide (ANP).

== Local renin–angiotensin systems ==
Locally expressed renin–angiotensin systems have been found in a number of tissues, including the kidneys, adrenal glands, the heart, vasculature and nervous system, and have a variety of functions, including local cardiovascular regulation, in association or independently of the systemic renin–angiotensin system, as well as non-cardiovascular functions. Outside the kidneys, renin is predominantly picked up from the circulation but may be secreted locally in some tissues; its precursor prorenin is highly expressed in tissues and more than half of circulating prorenin is of extrarenal origin, but its physiological role besides serving as precursor to renin is still unclear. Outside the liver, angiotensinogen is picked up from the circulation or expressed locally in some tissues; with renin they form angiotensin I, and locally expressed angiotensin-converting enzyme, chymase or other enzymes can transform it into angiotensin II. This process can be intracellular or interstitial.

In the adrenal glands, it is likely involved in the paracrine regulation of aldosterone secretion; in the heart and vasculature, it may be involved in remodeling or vascular tone; and in the brain, where it is largely independent of the circulatory RAS, it may be involved in local blood pressure regulation. In addition, both the central and peripheral nervous systems can use angiotensin for sympathetic neurotransmission. Other places of expression include the reproductive system, the skin and digestive organs. Medications aimed at the systemic system may affect the expression of those local systems, beneficially or adversely.

== Fetal renin–angiotensin system ==
In the fetus, the renin–angiotensin system is predominantly a sodium-losing system, as angiotensin II has little or no effect on aldosterone levels. Renin levels are high in the fetus, while angiotensin II levels are significantly lower; this is due to the limited pulmonary blood flow, preventing ACE (found predominantly in the pulmonary circulation) from having its maximum effect.

== Clinical significance ==
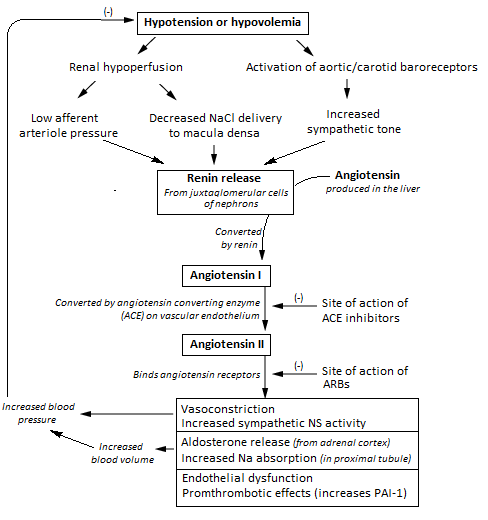
Flowchart showing the clinical effects of RAAS activity and the sites of action of ACE inhibitors and angiotensin receptor blockers.

- Inhibitors of angiotensin-converting enzyme are often used to reduce the formation of the more potent angiotensin II. Captopril is an example of an ACE inhibitor. ACE cleaves a number of other peptides, and in this capacity is an important regulator of the kinin–kallikrein system, as such blocking ACE can lead to side effects.
- Angiotensin II receptor antagonists, also known as angiotensin receptor blockers, can be used to prevent angiotensin II from acting on its receptors.
- Direct renin inhibitors can also be used for hypertension. The drugs that inhibit renin are aliskiren and the investigational remikiren.
- Vaccines against angiotensin II, for example CYT006-AngQb, have been investigated.

== See also ==
- Discovery and development of angiotensin receptor blockers
- Atrial natriuretic peptide: When the atrium stretches, blood pressure is considered to be increased and sodium is excreted to lower blood pressure.
- Bainbridge reflex: In response to stretching of the right atrium wall, heart rate increases, lowering venous blood pressure.
- Baroreflex: When the stretch receptors in the aortic arch and carotid sinus increase, the blood pressure is considered to be elevated and the heart rate decreases to lower blood pressure.
- Antidiuretic hormone: The hypothalamus detects the extracellular fluid hyperosmolality and the posterior pituitary gland secretes antidiuretic hormone to increase water reabsorption in the collecting duct.
