= Women's Declaration =

Women's Declaration may refer to:

- Declaration of the Rights of Woman and of the Female Citizen, a 1791 text authored by Olympe de Gouges
- Women's Declaration of Rights, an 1876 declaration
- Women's Declaration on Population Policies, a 1994 declaration
- Beijing Declaration, a 1995 declaration
- Declaration on Women's Rights, a 2020 declaration in support of gender equality
- Women's Declaration International, a British advocacy group described as anti-trans founded in 2019
