= Laboratoires Servier =

International pharmaceutical company governed by a non-profit foundation

Servier
- Type: Private
- Industry: Pharmaceutical
- Founded: (1954; 72 years ago)
- Founder: Jacques Servier
- Headquarters: Suresnes, Île-de-France, France
- Products: Pharmaceuticals
- Revenue: ▲€5.9 billion (2024)
- Net income: ▲€404 million (2024)
- Number of employees: 22,000
- Website: Official website

Servier Laboratories (French: Laboratoires Servier, often abbreviated to Servier) is an international pharmaceutical company founded by Jacques Servier and now governed by a non-profit foundation, with its headquarters in France (Suresnes).

The consolidated turnover for the 2018 financial year was €4.2 billion. Servier is the leading French independent pharmaceutical company, and the second largest French pharmaceutical company. It has branches in 149 countries, achieving 82% of its sales outside France. The company reportedly invests a little under 25% of its turnover in research and development, which occupies 3,000 of its 22,000 employees worldwide. The company's production sites produced 853 million drug boxes in 2013.

The Servier Clinical Support Unit in Gidy (near Orléans), which produces drugs for clinical trials, is the largest unit of its kind in Europe. Servier Laboratories is a full member of the European Federation of Pharmaceutical Industries and Associations (EFPIA).

In 2018, Servier finalized the acquisition of Shire's oncology branch in Boston and named David K. Lee as CEO. The official opening of Servier's new U.S. headquarters took place in 2019.

In 2009, Mediator, an amphetamine-based Servier drug originally developed for weight loss in people with diabetes but often prescribed off-label as a dieting aid, was withdrawn from the market after being linked to 500–2000 deaths in France. Further investigations found that many previous safety alerts on that drug had been either missed or covered up, possibly due to the improper influence of the well-connected company. On March 29, 2021, a French court fined Servier €2.7m (£2.3m) after finding it guilty of deception and manslaughter, with Mediator linked to the deaths of up to 2,000 people. The former executive Jean-Philippe Seta was sentenced to a suspended jail sentence of four years, while the elderly Jacques Servier had died in 2014 and therefore could not be judged. The French medicines agency, accused of failing to act quickly enough on warnings about the drug, was fined €303,000.

== Product portfolio ==
Notable products:

- Gliclazide (Diamicron, Diamicron MR) — antidiabetic drug
- Indapamide (Fludex SR, Natrilex SR, Lozide) — diuretic
- Ivabradine (Procoralan)
- Perindopril (Coversyl) — ACE inhibitor
- Strontium ranelate (Protelos) — osteoporosis agent
- Amineptine (Survector, Maneon, Directim)
- Tianeptine (Stablon)
- Trimetazidine (Vastarel MR) — antianginal drug.

Other products:

- Agomelatine (Valdoxan, Melitor, Thymanax)
- Almitrine (Duxil, Vectarion)
- Benfluorex (Mediaxal)
- Carbutamide (Glucidoral)
- Daflon 500
- Fenspiride (Pneumorel)
- Fotemustine (Muphoran)
- Fusafungine (Locabiotal)
- Gliclazide (Diamicron)
- Indapamide (Natrilix, Tertensif, Lozide)
- Pegaspargase (Oncaspar) — Acute lymphoblastic leukemia treatment
- Perindopril (Coversyl, Prestarium)
- Perindopril/indapamide (Preterax, Coversyl Plus)
- Piribedil (Trivastal retard)
- Rilmenidine (Hyperium)
- Tianeptine (Coaxil, Stablon)
- Sodium alginate (Pseudophage)
- Sulbutiamine (Arcalion)
- Tertatolol (Artex)
- Vitamins (Vitathion)

== Collaborative research ==
As well as internal research and development activities, Servier undertakes publicly funded collaborative research projects with industrial and academic partners. One example, in the area of non-clinical safety assessment, is the InnoMed PredTox. The company is expanding its activities in joint research projects within the framework of the Innovative Medicines Initiative of EFPIA and the European Commission.

In addition to these, Servier engages in research and licensing collaborations across the pharmaceutical and biotechnology industry. These collaborations include:

- In Cardiology: XENTION (UK, 2013), AMGEN (USA, 2013), MIRAGEN (USA, 2011), ARMGO (USA, 2006)
- In Diabetes: INTARCIA (USA, 2014)
- In Metabolic diseases: INTERCEPT - TGR5 agonists (USA, 2011), Genfit (FR, 2004)
- In Neurology (MS): GENEURO (CH, 2014)
- In Oncology: CTI BIOPHARMA (USA, 2014), NOVARTIS (CH, 2014), CELLECTIS (FR, 2014), NERVIANO (IT, 2013), EOS (IT) / CLOVIS (USA, 2012), BIOINVENT (SE, 2012), MACROGENICS (USA, 2011/12), GALAPAGOS (NDL, 2011), BIOREALITES (FR, 2011), PHARMACYCLICS - HDAC inhibitor (USA, 2009), HYBRIGENICS (FR, 2007/2011) VERNALIS (UK, 2007/2011)
- In Orphan Diseases/Cardiology/Diabetes: XOMA (USA, 2010)
- In Osteoporosis & Osteoarthritis: OSTEOLOGIX (USA, 2010), GALAPAGOS (NDL, 2010), KAROS (USA, 2010), NORDIC BIOSCIENCE (DK, 2006/2010)

Servier acquired Symphogen in 2020.

== Controversy ==
Servier Laboratories has been the subject of worldwide scandal for creating and distributing a weight-loss drug called Mediator (Benfluorex), which may have killed up to 2,100 people.

The movie 150 Milligrams, by director Emmanuelle Bercot, features Dr. Irène Frachon discovering that Mediator pills cause heart valve problems/deaths and how in 2009 she starts an uphill battle against the producer and the French health authorities.

In March 2021, Servier was sentenced to a fine of 2.7 million euros for aggravated deception and involuntary manslaughter, however it was acquitted of fraud charges. The court also ordered the company to pay several hundred million euros in damages to the 6,500 plaintiffs, and one of its leading managers was sentenced to four years on probation. The French medical agency ANSM was fined 300,000 euros for failing proper supervision.

A French pharmaceutical company, Servier continued its operations in Russia despite international sanctions and the geopolitical consequences of Russia's invasion of Ukraine. The company's decision to maintain its presence in the region was criticized by organizations advocating for ethical corporate conduct during global conflicts.
