= Olympe de Gouges =

French playwright and activist (1746–1793)

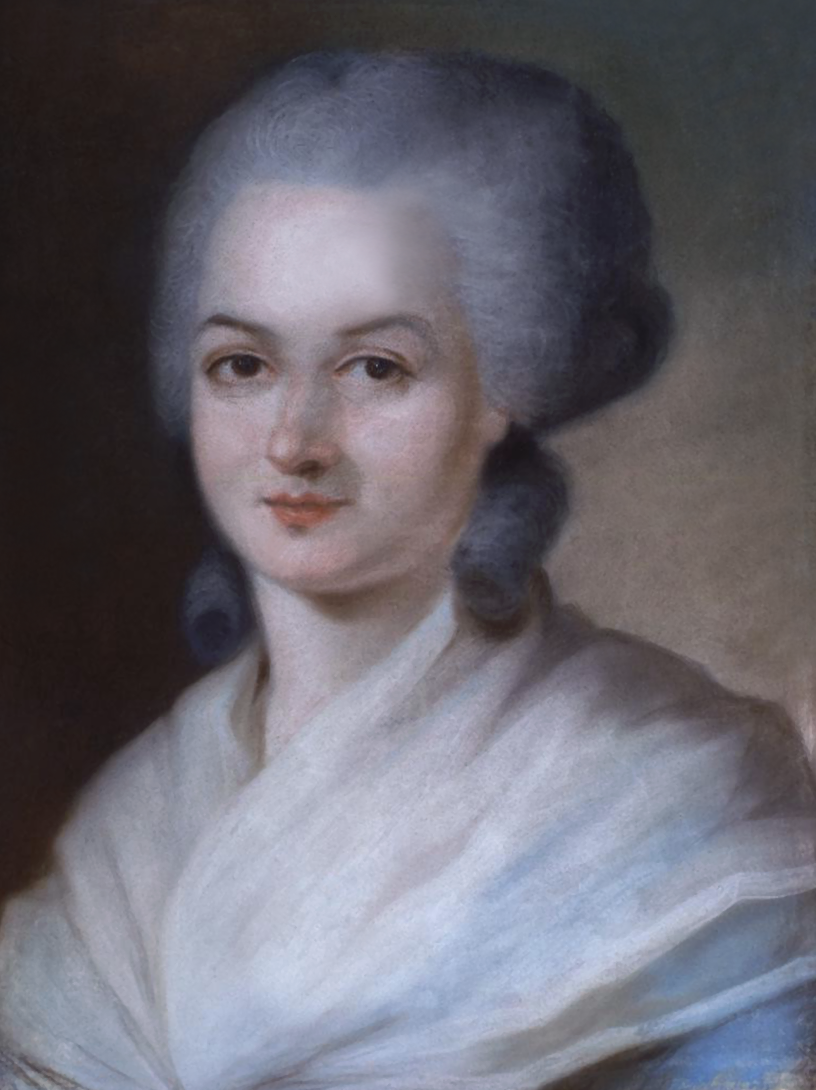
- Portrait by Alexander Kucharsky
- Born: Marie Gouze; 7 May 1748; Montauban, Quercy, Kingdom of France
- Died: 3 November 1793 (aged 45); Place de la Révolution, Paris, French First Republic
- Cause of death: Execution by guillotine
- Occupations: Activist; abolitionist; women's rights advocate; playwright
- Spouse: Louis Aubry (m. 1765; died 1766)
- Children: 1

Olympe de Gouges (French: [ɔlɛ̃p də ɡuʒ]; born Marie Gouze; 7 May 1748 – 3 November 1793) was a French playwright and political activist. She is best known for her Declaration of the Rights of Woman and of the Female Citizen and other writings on women's rights and abolitionism.

Born in southwestern France, de Gouges began her prolific career as a playwright in Paris in the 1780s. A passionate advocate of human rights, she was one of France's earliest public opponents of slavery. Her plays and pamphlets spanned a wide variety of issues including divorce and marriage, children's rights, unemployment and social security. In addition to her being a playwright and political activist, she was also a small time actress prior to the Revolution. De Gouges welcomed the outbreak of the French Revolution but soon became disenchanted when equal rights were not extended to women. In 1791, in response to the 1789 Declaration of the Rights of Man and of the Citizen, de Gouges published her Declaration of the Rights of Woman and of the Female Citizen, in which she challenged the practice of male authority and advocated for equal rights for women.

De Gouges was associated with the moderate Girondins and opposed the execution of Louis XVI. Her increasingly vehement writings, which attacked Maximilien Robespierre's radical Montagnards and the Revolutionary government during the Reign of Terror, led to her eventual arrest and execution by guillotine in 1793.

== Biography ==
=== Birth and parentage ===
Marie Gouze was born on 7 May 1748 in Montauban, Quercy (in the present-day department of Tarn-et-Garonne), in southwestern France. Her mother, Anne Olympe Mouisset Gouze, was the daughter of a bourgeois family. The identity of her father is ambiguous. Her father may have been her mother's husband, Pierre Gouze, or she may have been the illegitimate daughter of Jean-Jacques Lefranc, Marquis de Pompignan. Marie Gouze encouraged rumours that Pompignan was her father, and their relationship is considered plausible but "historically unverifiable." Other rumours in the eighteenth century also suggested that her father might be Louis XV, but this identification is not considered credible.

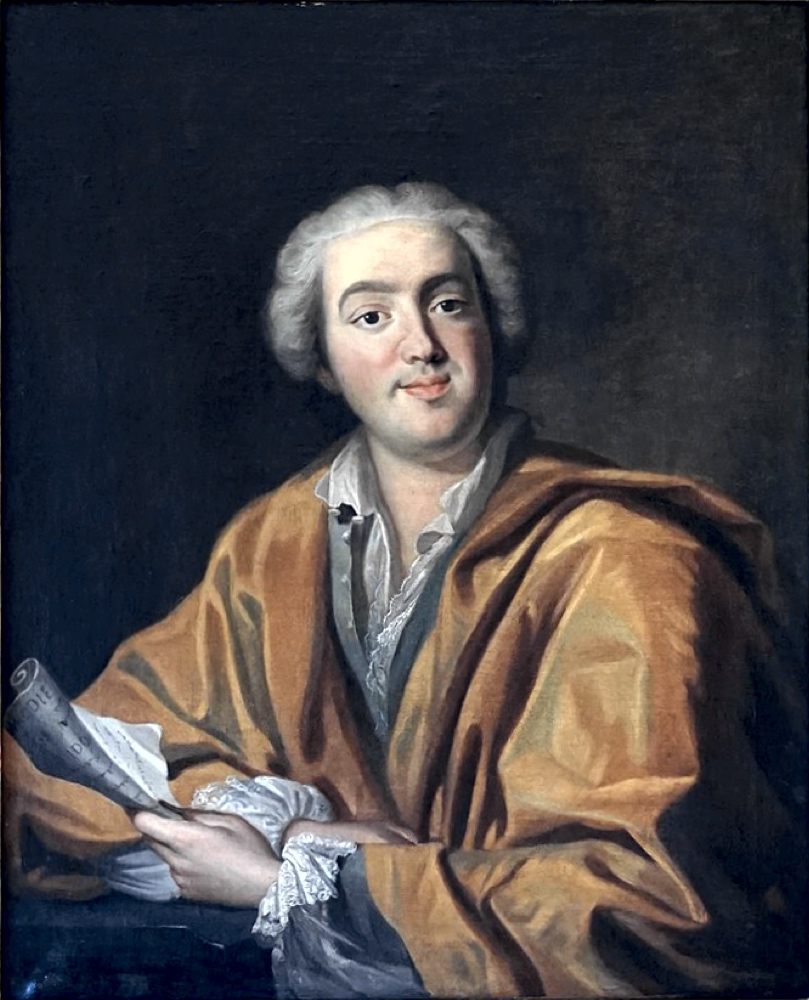
Jean-Jacques Lefranc, Marquis de Pompignan, widely rumoured to be Olympe de Gouges's father

The Pompignan family had long-standing close ties to the Mouisset family of Marie Gouze's mother, Anne. When Anne was born in 1714, the eldest Pompignan son, Jean-Jacques Lefranc de Pompignan (age five), was her godfather. Anne's father tutored him as he grew. During their childhoods, Pompignan became close to Anne, but was separated from her in 1734 when he was sent to Paris. Anne married Pierre Gouze, a butcher, in 1737 and had three children before Marie, a son and two girls. Pompignan returned to Montauban in 1747, the year before Marie's birth. Pierre was legally recognized as Marie's father. Pierre did not attend Marie's baptism on 8 May. Her godfather was a workman named Jean Portié, and her godmother a woman named Marie Grimal. Pierre died in 1750.

The primary support for the identification of Pompignan as Marie Gouze's father is found in her semi-autobiographical novel, Mémoires de Madame de Valmont, published after Pompignan's death. According to the contemporary politician Jean-Baptiste Poncet-Delpech and others, "all of Montauban" knew that Pompignan was Gouze's father. However, some historians consider it likely that Gouze fabricated the story for her memoirs in order to raise her prestige and social standing when she moved to Paris.

=== Early life ===
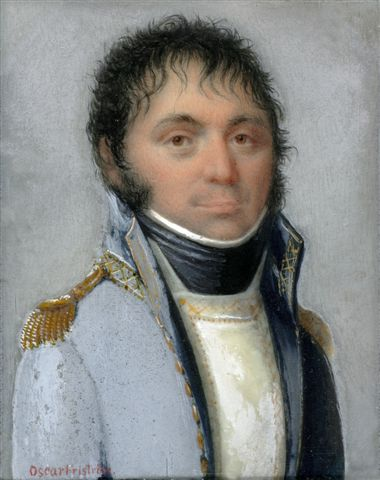
Olympe de Gouges's son, Pierre Aubry

Marie-Olympe de Gouges (formally Marie Gouze) was born into a wealthy family, and although her mother was privately tutored, she had no actual formal education herself. Reportedly illiterate, she was said to dictate to a secretary.

Gouze was married on 24 October 1765 to Louis Yves Aubry, a caterer, against her will. The heroine of her semi-autobiographical novel Mémoires is fourteen at her wedding; the new Marie Aubry herself was seventeen. Her novel strongly decried the marriage: "I was married to a man I did not love and who was neither rich nor well-born. I was sacrificed for no reason that could make up for the repugnance I felt for this man." Marie's substantially larger fortune allowed her new husband Louis to leave his employer and start his own business. On 29 August 1766, she gave birth to their son, Pierre Aubry. That November, a destructive flood of the river Tarn caused Louis' death. She never married again, calling the institution of marriage "the tomb of trust and love".

Known under the name Marie Aubry, after her husband's death she changed her name to Olympe de Gouges, from her surname (Gouze) and adding her mother's middle name, Olympe. Soon after, she began a relationship with the wealthy Jacques Biétrix de Rozières, a businessman from Lyon.

=== Move to Paris ===
In 1768, Biétrix funded de Gouges's move to Paris, where he provided her with an income. She lived with her son and her sister. She socialized in fashionable society, at one point being called "one of Paris' prettiest women," and formed friendships with Madame de Montesson and Louis Philippe II, Duke of Orléans. De Gouges attended the artistic and philosophical salons of Paris, where she met many writers, including La Harpe, Mercier, and Chamfort, as well as future politicians such as Brissot and Condorcet. She usually was invited to the salons of Madame de Montesson and the Comtesse de Beauharnais, who also were playwrights.

De Gouges began her career as a writer in Paris, publishing a novel in 1784 and then beginning a prolific career as a playwright. As a woman from the province and of lowly birth she fashioned herself to fit in with the Paris establishment. De Gouges signed her public letters with citoyenne, the feminised version of citizen. In pre-revolutionary France there were no citizens, and authors were the subjects of the king, but in revolutionary France there were only citoyens. It was in October 1792 that the Convention decreed the use of citoyenne to replace Madame and Mademoiselle.

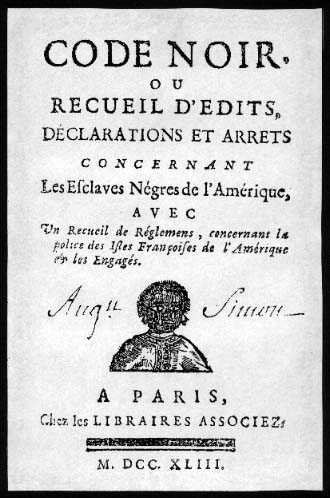
The Code Noir, a decree passed by King Louis XIV in 1685. The Code Noir defined the conditions of slavery in the French colonial empire and restricted the activities of free Negroes

In 1788 she published Réflexions sur les hommes nègres, which demanded compassion for the plight of slaves in the French colonies. For de Gouges there was a direct link between the autocratic monarchy in France and the institution of slavery. She argued that "Men everywhere are equal... Kings who are just do not want slaves; they know that they have submissive subjects." She came to wider public attention with the play Zamore et Mirza, which was staged at the Comédie-Française in December 1789 under the title L'Esclavage des Noirs. Her stance against slavery in the French colonies made her the target of threats. De Gouges was also attacked by those who thought that a woman's proper place was not in the theatre. The influential Abraham-Joseph Bénard remarked "Mme de Gouges is one of those women to whom one feels like giving razor blades as a present, who through their pretensions lose the charming qualities of their sex... Every woman author is in a false position, regardless of her talent." De Gouges was defiant: she wrote "I'm determined to be a success, and I'll do it in spite of my enemies." The slave trade lobby mounted a press campaign against her play and she eventually took legal action, forcing Comédie-Française to stage L'Esclavage des Noirs. But the play closed after three performances; the lobby had paid hecklers to sabotage the performances.

=== Revolutionary politics ===
A passionate advocate of human rights, de Gouges greeted the outbreak of the Revolution with hope and joy, but soon became disenchanted when égalité (equal rights) was not extended to women. In 1791, influenced and inspired by John Locke's treatises on natural rights, de Gouges became part of the Society of the Friends of Truth, also known as the "Social Club," which was an association whose goals included establishing equal political and legal rights for women. Members sometimes gathered at the home of the well-known women's rights advocate, Sophie de Condorcet. In 1791, in response to the Declaration of the Rights of Man and of the Citizen, she wrote the Déclaration des droits de la Femme et de la Citoyenne ("Declaration of the Rights of Woman and of the Female Citizen"). In that pamphlet she expressed, for the first time, her famous statement:

A woman has the right to mount the scaffold. She must equally have the right to mount the speaker's platform.

The Declaration of the Rights of Woman and of the Female Citizen followed the same 17 article structure as the Declaration of the Rights of Man and of the Citizen, and emphasized the rights women should have in the new French government. This was followed by her Contrat Social ("Social Contract", named after a famous work of Jean-Jacques Rousseau), proposing marriage based upon gender equality.

In 1790 and 1791, in the French colony of Saint-Domingue (present-day Haiti), free people of colour and African slaves revolted in response to the ideals expressed in the Declaration of the Rights of Man and of the Citizen. De Gouges did not approve of violent revolution, and published L'Esclavage des Noirs with a preface in 1792, arguing that the slaves and the free people who responded to the horrors of slavery with "barbaric and atrocious torture" in turn justified the behavior of the tyrants. In Paris, de Gouges was accused by the mayor of Paris of having incited the insurrection in Saint-Domingue with the play. When it was staged again in December 1792 a riot erupted in Paris.

De Gouges opposed the execution of Louis XVI (which took place on 21 January 1793), partly out of opposition to capital punishment and partly because she favored constitutional monarchy. This earned her the ire of many hard-line republicans, even into the next generation—such as the 19th-century historian Jules Michelet, a fierce apologist for the Revolution, who wrote, "She allowed herself to act and write about more than one affair that her weak head did not understand." Michelet opposed any political participation by women and thus disliked de Gouges. In December 1792, when Louis XVI was about to be put on trial, she wrote to the National Assembly offering to defend him, causing outrage among many deputies. In her letter she argued that he had been duped—that he was guilty as a king, but innocent as a man, and that he should be exiled rather than executed.

Olympe de Gouges was associated with the Gironde faction, which ultimately led to her being executed. After the execution of Louis XVI she became wary of Robespierre's Montagnard faction and in open letters criticized their violence and summary killings. The reason she was sent to the guillotine was not because of her feministic views. Instead her crime was spreading Federalism as a replacement for Montagnard revolutionary central rule. Revolutionary rule during the Terror was accompanied by emphasis on masculine public political authority that resulted, for example, in the expulsion of women from Jacobin clubs.

=== Arrest and execution ===
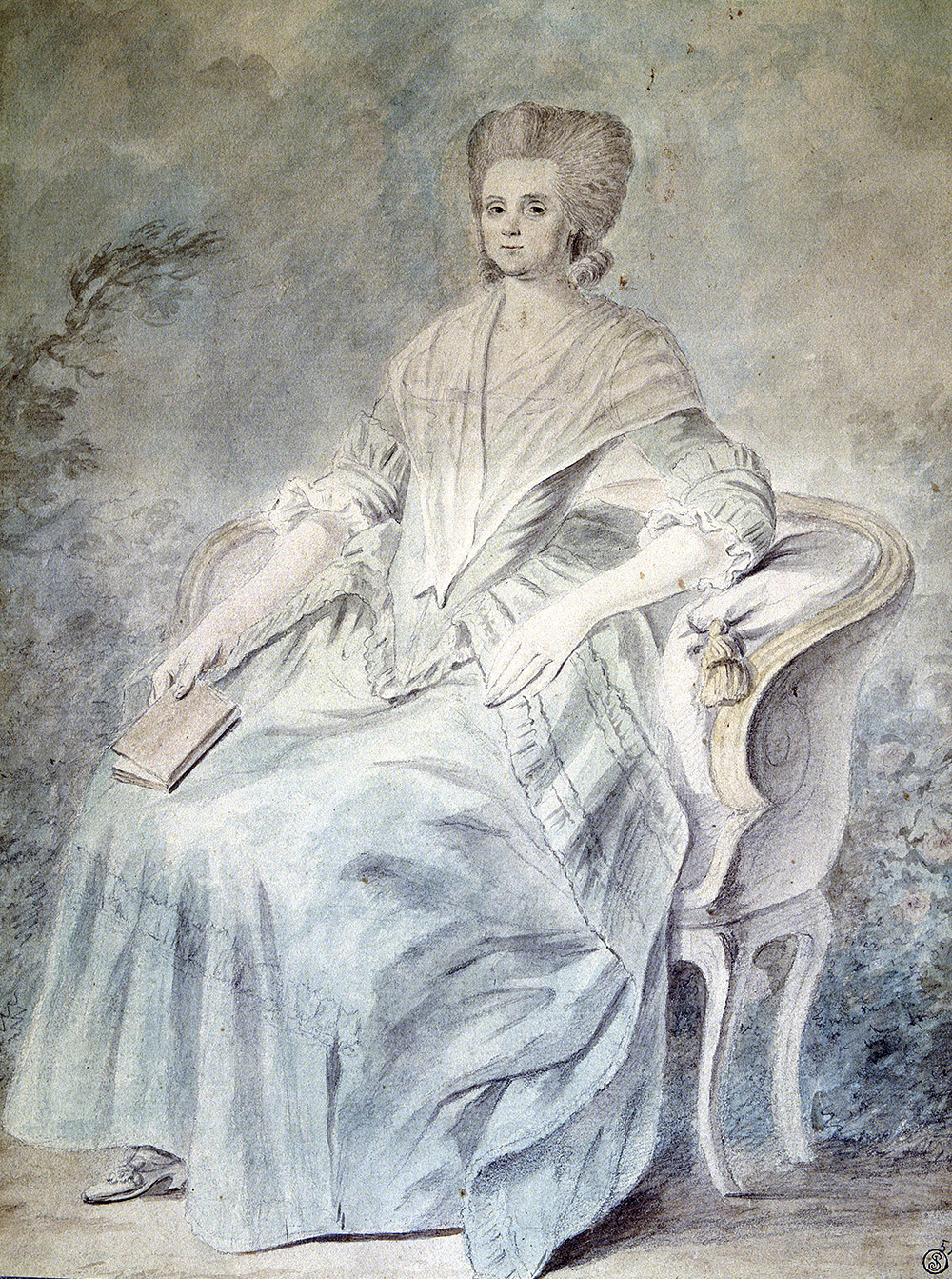
Olympe de Gouges, 1793

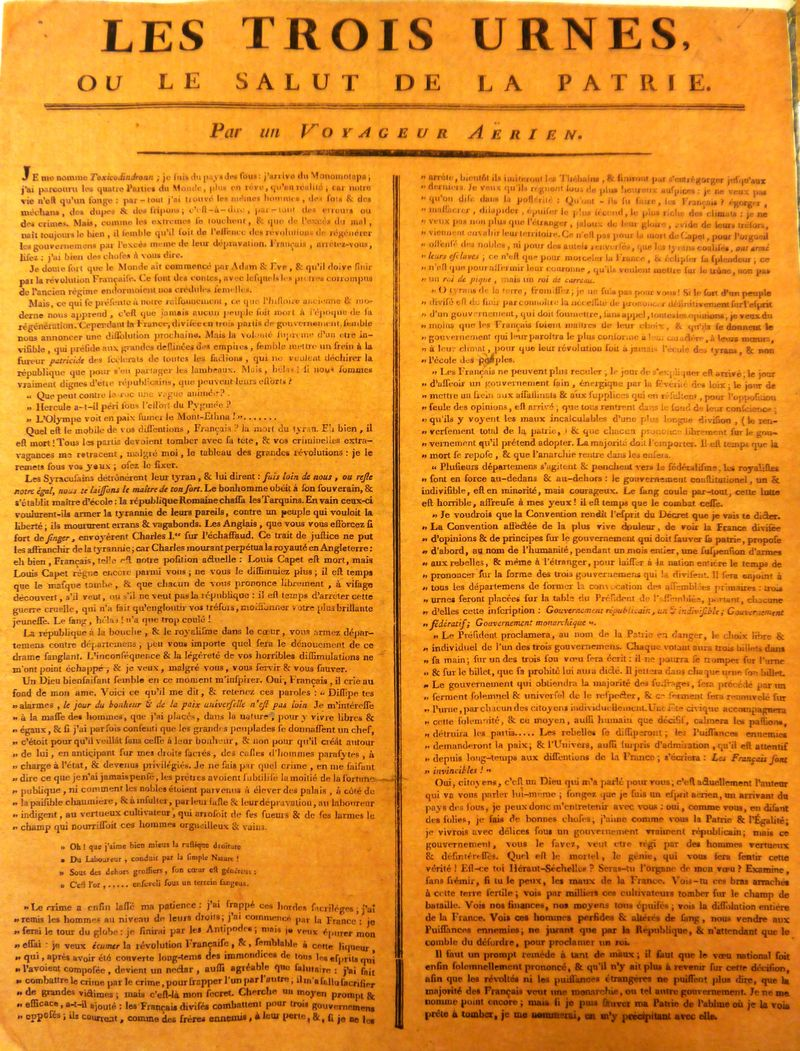
Les trois urnes, the 1793 poster by Olympe de Gouges that led to her arrest and execution

As the Revolution progressed, she became more and more vehement in her writings. On 2 June 1793, the Jacobins of the Montagnard faction imprisoned prominent Girondins; they were sent to the guillotine in October. Finally, her poster Les Trois urnes, ou le Salut de la Patrie, par un voyageur aérien ("The Three Urns, or the Salvation of the Fatherland, by an Aerial Traveller") of 1793, led to her arrest. Olympe decreed in this publication that "Now is the time to establish a decent government whose energy comes from the strength of its laws; now is the time to put a stop to assassinations and the suffering they cause, for merely holding opposing views. Let everyone examine their consciences; let them see the incalculable harm caused by such a long-lasting division...and then everyone can pronounce freely on the government of their choice. The majority must carry the day. It is time for death to rest and for anarchy to return to the underworld." She also called for an end to the bloodshed of the Revolution saying "It is time to put a stop to this cruel war that has only swallowed up your treasure and harvested the most brilliant of your young. Blood, alas, has flowed far too freely!" and warned that "The divided French... are fighting for three opposing governments; like warring brothers they rush to their downfall and, if I do not halt them, they will soon imitate the Thebans, ending up by slitting each others throats to the last man standing". That piece demanded a plebiscite for a choice among three potential forms of government: the first, a unitary republic, the second, a federalist government, or the third, a constitutional monarchy. The problem was that the law of the revolution made it a capital offense for anyone to publish a book or pamphlet that encouraged reestablishing the monarchy.

Marie-Olympe de Gouges was arrested on 20 July 1793. Although she was arrested in July, she would not meet the end of her life until November of that year. After her arrest, the commissioners searched her house for evidence. When they could not find any in her home, she voluntarily led them to the storehouse where she kept her papers. It was there that the commissioners found an unfinished play titled La France Sauvée ou le Tyran Détroné ("France Preserved, or The Tyrant Dethroned"). In the first act (only the first act and a half remain), Marie Antoinette is planning defense strategies to retain the crumbling monarchy and is confronted by revolutionary forces, including de Gouges herself. The first act ends with de Gouges reproving the queen for having seditious intentions and lecturing her about how she should lead her people. Both de Gouges and her prosecutor used this play as evidence in her trial. The prosecutor claimed that de Gouges's depictions of the queen threatened to stir up sympathy and support for the Royalists, whereas de Gouges stated that the play showed that she had always been a supporter of the Revolution.

She spent three months in jail without an attorney as the presiding judge had denied de Gouges her legal right to a lawyer on the grounds that she was more than capable of representing herself. It is likely that the judge based this argument on de Gouges's tendency to represent herself in her writings. Through her friends, she managed to publish two texts: Olympe de Gouges au tribunal révolutionnaire ("Olympe de Gouges at the Revolutionary tribunal"), in which she related her interrogations; and her last work, Une patriote persécutée ("A [female] patriot persecuted"), in which she condemned the Terror.

De Gouges had acquired for her son, Pierre Aubry, a position as a vice-general and head of battalion in exchange for a payment of 1,500 livres, and he was suspended from this office after her arrest. On 2 November 1793 she wrote to him: "I die, my dear son, a victim of my idolatry for the fatherland and for the people. Under the specious mask of republicanism, her enemies have brought me remorselessly to the scaffold."

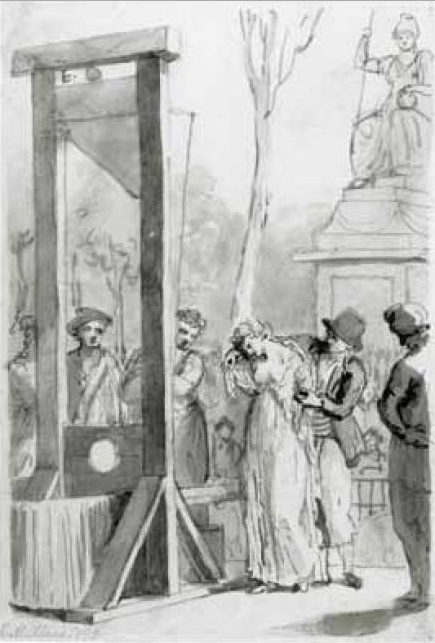
The execution of Olympe de Gouges

On 3 November 1793, the Revolutionary Tribunal sentenced her to death, and she was executed for seditious behavior and attempting to reinstate the monarchy. Olympe was executed only a month after Condorcet had been proscribed, and just three days after the Girondin leaders had been guillotined. Her body was disposed of in the Madeleine Cemetery. Olympe's last moments were depicted by an anonymous Parisian who kept a chronicle of events:

Yesterday, at seven o'clock in the evening, a most extraordinary person called Olympe de Gouges who held the imposing title of woman of letters, was taken to the scaffold, while all of Paris, while admiring her beauty, knew that she didn't even know her alphabet... She approached the scaffold with a calm and serene expression on her face, and forced the guillotine's furies, which had driven her to this place of torture, to admit that such courage and beauty had never been seen before... That woman... had thrown herself in the Revolution, body and soul. But having quickly perceived how atrocious the system adopted by the Jacobins was, she chose to retrace her steps. She attempted to unmask the villains through the literary productions which she had printed and put up. They never forgave her, and she paid for her carelessness with her head.

=== Posthumous political impact ===
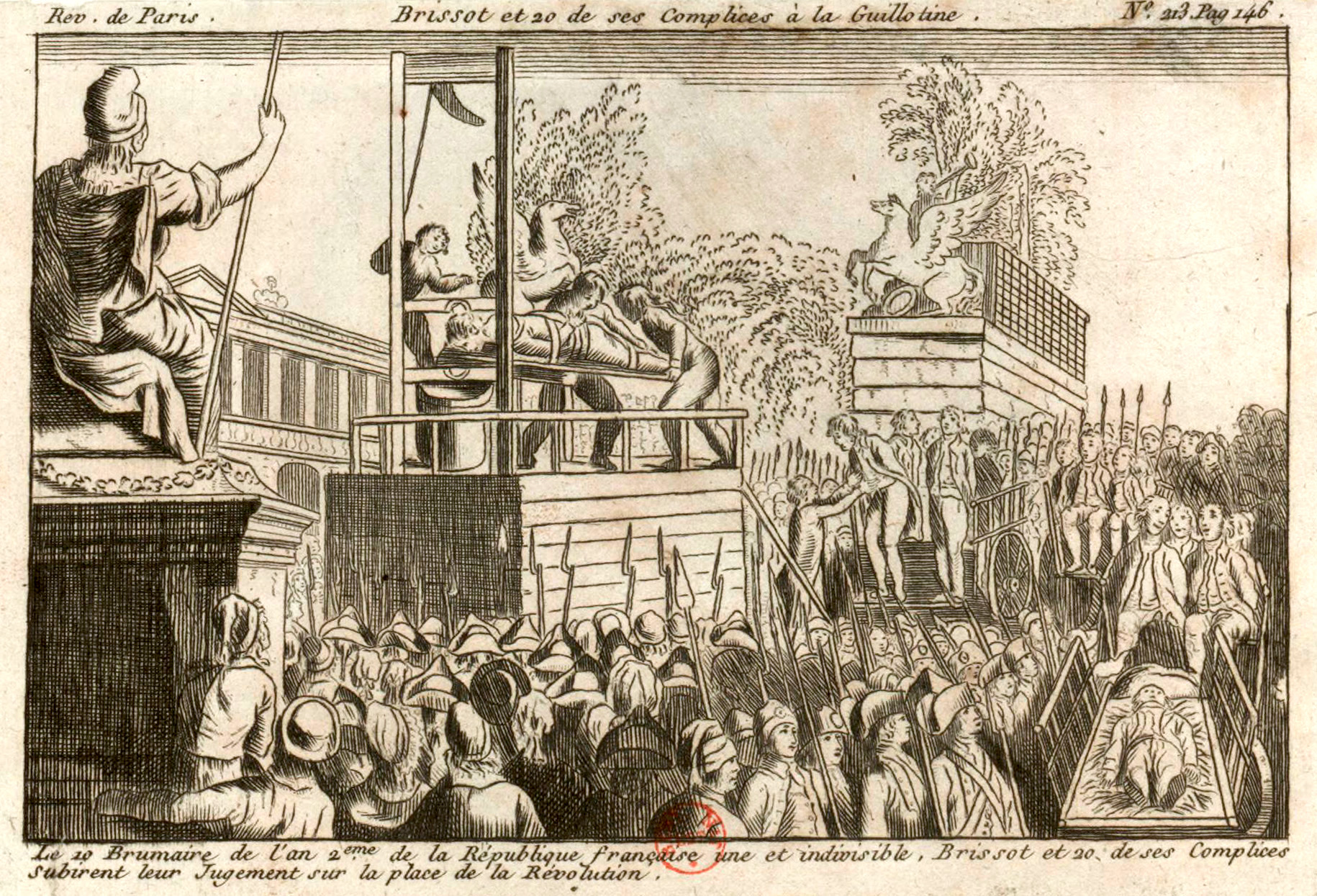
The execution of the Girondins

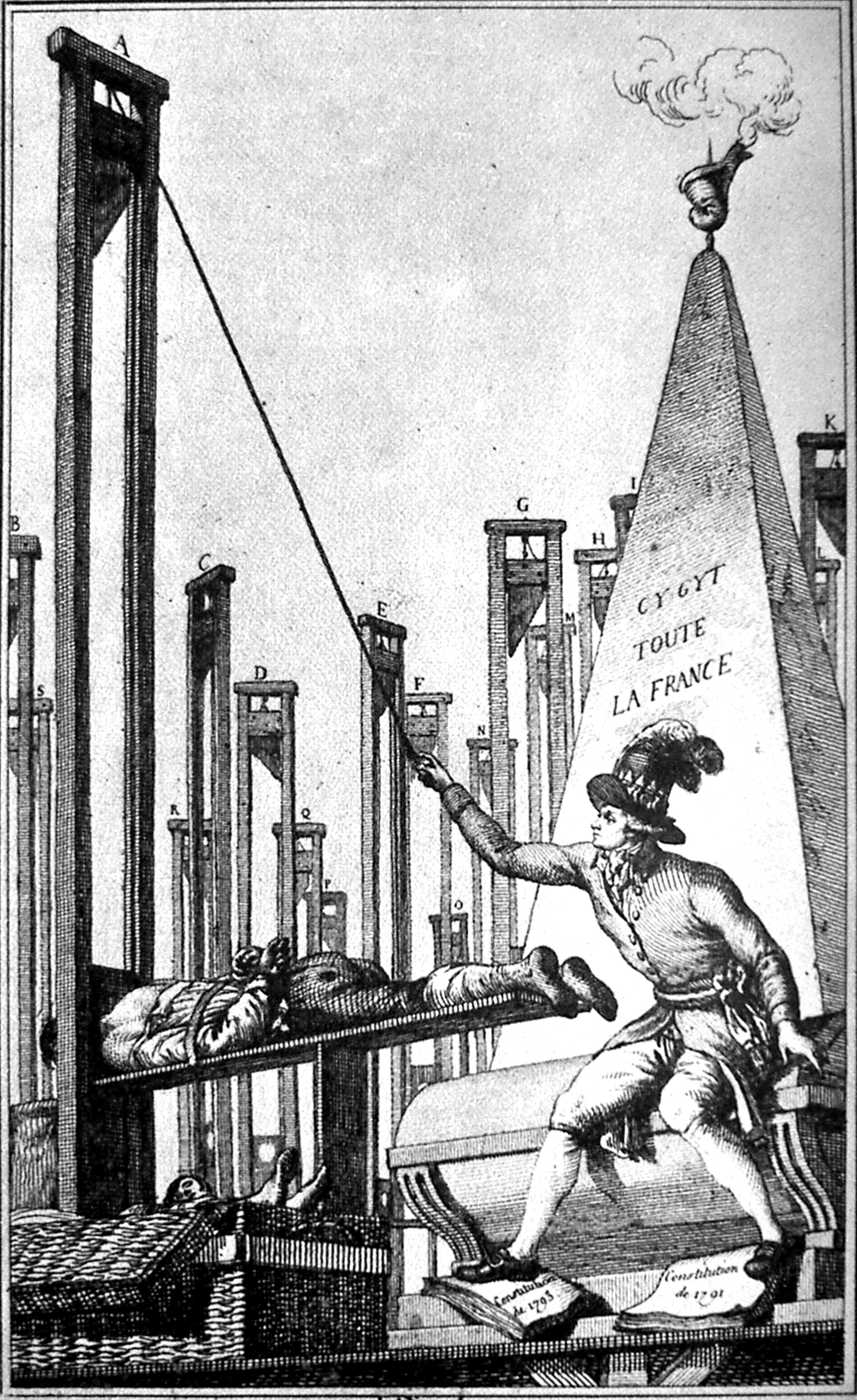
Cartoon showing Maximilien Robespierre guillotining the executioner after having guillotined everyone else in France.

Her execution was used as a warning to other politically active women. At the 15 November 1793 meeting of the Commune, Pierre Gaspard Chaumette cautioned a group of women wearing Phrygian bonnets, reminding them of "the impudent Olympe de Gouges, who was the first woman to start up women's political clubs, who abandoned the cares of her home, to meddle in the affairs of the Republic, and whose head fell under avenging blade of the law". This posthumous characterisation of de Gouges by the political establishment was misleading, as de Gouges had no role in founding the Society of Revolutionary Republican Women. In her political writings de Gouges had not called for women to abandon their homes, but she was cast by the politicians as an enemy of the natural order, and thus enemy of the ruling Jacobin party. Paradoxically, the two women who had started the Society of Revolutionary Republican Women, Claire Lacombe and Pauline Léon, were not executed. Lacombe, Léon and Theroigne de Mericourt had spoken at women's and mixed clubs, and the Assemblée, while de Gouges had shown a reluctance to engage in public speaking, but prolifically published pamphlets. However, Chaumette was a staunch opponent of the Girondins, and had characterised de Gouges as unnatural and unrepublican prior to her execution.

The year 1793 has been described as a watershed for the construction of women's place in revolutionary France, and the deconstruction of the Girondins' Marianne. That year a number of women with a public role in politics were executed, including Madame Roland and Marie Antoinette. The new Républicaine was the republican mother that nurtured the new citizen. During this time the Convention banned all women's political associations and executed many politically active women. 1793 marked the start of the Reign of Terror in post-revolutionary France, where thousands of people were executed. Across the Atlantic world observers of the French Revolution were shocked, but the ideals of liberté, égalité, fraternité had taken a life of their own.

De Gouges's Declaration of the Rights of Woman and of the Female Citizen had been widely reproduced and influenced the writings of women's advocates in the Atlantic world. One year after its publication, in 1792, the keen observer of the French Revolution Mary Wollstonecraft published A Vindication of the Rights of Woman. Writings on women and their lack of rights became widely available. The experience of French women during the revolution entered the collective consciousness.

American women began to refer to themselves as citess or citizeness and took to the streets to achieve equality and freedom. The same year de Gouges was executed the pamphlet On the Marriage of Two Celebrated Widows was published anonymously, proclaiming that "two celebrated widows, ladies of America and France, after having repudiated their husbands on account of their ill treatment, conceived of the design of living together in the strictest union and friendship." Revolutionary novels were published that put women at the centre of violent struggle, such as the narratives written by Helen Maria Williams and Leonora Sansay. At the 1848 Women's Rights Convention at Seneca Falls, the rhetorical style of the Declaration of the Rights of Woman and of the Female Citizen was employed to paraphrase the United States Declaration of Independence into the Declaration of Sentiments, which demanded women's right to vote.

After her execution her son Pierre Aubry signed a letter in which he denied his endorsement for her political legacy. He tried to change her name in the records, to Marie Aubry, but the name she had given herself has endured.

=== Descendants ===
Olympe de Gouges's son Pierre Aubry (de Gouges), who at the start of the Revolution was living with Marie-Hyacinthe Mabille, married Mabille after the Reign of Terror. In 1801, he was posted by Napoleon Bonaparte to a command in French Guiana, where he arrived with his family in 1802 and died on 7 February 1803. They had at least two daughters and three sons, including:

- Geneviève Hyacinthe Aubry de Gouges (1793–1853), married in 1810 in Basse-Terre on Guadeloupe to British Royal Navy Captain William Wood, a landowner in Tasmania, where he later settled and is buried with his wife.
- Louis Anacharsis Aubry de Gouges (1794–1855), married in Paris to Louise Célestine Julie Leroy.
- Charlotte Olympe Aubry de Gouges (1796–1856), married in 1812 in Philadelphia to United States Congressman Robert Selden Garnett Sr. (1789–1840) of Virginia. Their children included Confederate general Robert Selden Garnett Jr. (1819–1861).
- Jean Hélie Hippolyte Aubry de Gouges (1798–1870), married in 1839 in Batignolles (now a neighborhood of Paris) to Marie-Jeanne Hergott.

== Writing ==
All of Olympe de Gouges's plays and novels convey the overarching theme of her life's work: indignation at social injustices. In addition to women's rights, de Gouges engaged contested topics including the slave trade, divorce, marriage, debtors' prisons, children's rights, and government work schemes for the unemployed. Much of her work foregrounded the troubling intersections of two or more issues. While many plays by women playwrights staged at the Comédie Française were published anonymously or under male pseudonyms, de Gouges broke with tradition; not only did she publish using her own name, but she also pushed the boundaries of what was deemed appropriate subject matter for women playwrights—and withstood the consequences. A record of her papers which were seized at the time of execution in 1793 lists about 40 plays.

In 1784, she published an epistolary novel inspired by Les Liaisons dangereuses (1782) by Pierre Choderlos de Laclos. Her novel claimed to consist of authentic letters exchanged with her father the Marquis de Pompignan, with the names changed. "Madame Valmont" thus represented de Gouges herself, and "Monsieur de Flaucourt" was Pompignan. The full title of the novel, published shortly after Pompignan's death, indicated its claim: Mémoires de Madame de Valmont sur l'ingratitude et la cruauté de la famille des Flaucourt avec la sienne dont les sieurs de Flaucourt on reçu tant de services (Madame de Valmont's Memoirs on the Ingratitude and Cruelty of the Flaucourt Family Towards her Own, which Rendered such Services to the Sirs Flaucourt).

As a playwright, she charged into the contemporary political controversies and was often in the vanguard. Alongside Marquis de Condorcet, de Gouges is considered one of France's earliest public opponents of slavery.

De Gouges's first staged production was originally titled Zamore et Mirza; ou L'Heureux Naufrage [Zamore and Mirza; or The Happy Shipwreck] (1788). Drawing both praise from abolitionists and attacks from pro-slavery traders, it is the first French play to focus not only on the inhumanity of slavery but also the first to feature the first-person perspective of an enslaved individual.

In her 1788 "Réflexions sur les Hommes Nègres" she brought to attention the horrible plight of slaves in the French colonies and condemned the injustice of the institution declaring “I clearly realized that it was force and prejudice that had condemned them to that horrible slavery, in which Nature plays no role, and for which the unjust and powerful interests of Whites are alone responsible” likewise declaring that "Men everywhere are equal... Kings who are just do not want slaves; they know that they have submissive subjects."

In the final act of L'Esclavage des Noirs de Gouges lets the French colonial master, not the slave, utter a prayer for freedom: "Let our common rejoicings be a happy portent of liberty". She drew a parallel between colonial slavery and political oppression in France. One of the slave protagonists explains that the French must gain their own freedom, before they can deal with slavery. De Gouges also openly attacked the notion that human rights were a reality in revolutionary France. The slave protagonist comments on the situation in France "The power of one Master alone is in the hands of a thousand Tyrants who trample the People under foot. The People will one day burst their chains and will claim all its rights under Natural law. It will teach the Tyrants just what a people united by long oppression and enlightened by sound philosophy can do". While it was common in France to equate political oppression to slavery, this was an analogy and not an abolitionist sentiment.

=== Political pamphlets and letters ===
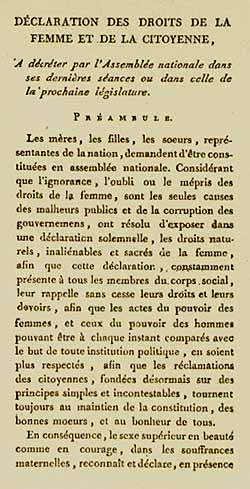
First page of Declaration of the Rights of Woman and of the Female Citizen

Over the course of her career, de Gouges published 68 pamphlets. Her first political brochure was published in November 1788, a manifesto entitled Letter to the people, or project for a patriotic fund. In early 1789 she published Remarques Patriotiques setting out her proposals for social security, care for the elderly, institutions for homeless children, hostels for the unemployed, and the introduction of a jury system. In this work, she highlighted and promulgated the issues facing France on the brink of revolution writing “France is sunk in grief, the people are suffering and the Monarch cries out. Parliament is demanding the Estates-General and the Nation cannot come to an agreement. There is no consensus on electing these assemblies...The Third Estate, with reason, claims a voice equal to that of the Clergy and Nobility...for the problems that get worse every day” and declared to the king that “Your People are unhappy. Unhappy!”. She also called upon women to "shake off the yoke of shameful slavery". The same year she wrote a series of pamphlets on a range of social concerns, such as illegitimate children. In these pamphlets she advanced the public debate on issues that would later be picked up by feminists, such as Flora Tristan. She continued to publish political essays between 1788 and 1791. Such as Cry of the wise man, by a woman in response to Louis XVI calling together the Estates-General.

De Gouges wrote her famous Declaration of the Rights of Woman and of the Female Citizen shortly after the French Constitution of 1791 was ratified by King Louis XVI, and dedicated it to his wife, Queen Marie Antoinette. The French Constitution marked the birth of the short-lived constitutional monarchy and implemented a status based citizenship. Citizens were defined as men over 25 who were "independent" and who had paid the poll tax. These citizens had the right to vote. Furthermore, active citizenship was two-tiered, with those who could vote and those who were fit for public office. This two-tiered system divided citizens into active and passive sections, where active citizens, like men over 25 who were independent and paid the poll tax, enjoyed full citizenship status, while marginalized groups like women were considered passive and while they enjoyed civil and legal liberties could not vote or participate in politics. Women were by definition not afforded any rights of active citizenship. Like men who could not pay the poll tax, children, domestic servants, rural day-laborers and slaves, Jews, actors and hangmen, women had no political rights. In transferring sovereignty to the nation the constitution dismantled the old regime, but de Gouges argued that it did not go far enough.

De Gouges was not the only feminist who attempted to influence the political structures of late Enlightenment France. But like the writings of Etta Palm d'Aelders, Theroigne de Mericourt, Claire Lacombe, and Marquis de Condorcet, her arguments fell on deaf ears. At the end of the 18th century influential political actors such as Honoré Gabriel Riqueti, Charles Maurice de Talleyrand-Périgord, and Emmanuel Joseph Sieyès were not convinced of the case for equality.

In her early political letters de Gouges made a point of being a woman, and that she spoke "as a woman". She addressed her public letters, published often as pamphlets, to statesmen such as Jacques Necker, the Duke of Orléans, or the queen Marie Antoinette. Like other pamphlet writers in revolutionary France, she spoke from the margins and spoke of her experience as a citizen with a desire to influence the ongoing public debate. In her letters she articulated the values of the Enlightenment, and commented on how they may be put into practice, such as civic virtue, universal rights, natural rights and political rights. In language and practice this was a debate among men and about men. Republicans discussed civic virtue in terms of patriotic manliness (la vertu mâle et répub-licaine). Women were not granted political rights in revolutionary France, thus de Gouges used her pamphlets to enter the public debate and she argued that the debate needed to include the female civic voice.

De Gouges signed her pamphlets with citoyenne. It has been suggested that she adopted this notion from Rousseau's letter To the Republic of Geneva, where he speaks directly to two types of Genevans: the "dear fellow citizens" or his "brothers", and the aimables et virtueses Citoyenne, that is the women citizens. In the public letter Remarques Patriotique from December 1788 de Gouges justified why she is publishing her political thoughts, arguing that "This dream, strange though it may seem, will show the nation a truly civic heart, a spirit that is always concerned with the public good".

As the politics of revolutionary France changed and progressed de Gouges failed to become an actor on the political stage, but in her letters offered advice to the political establishment. Her proposition for a political order remained largely unchanged. She expresses faith in the Estates General and in reference to the estates of the realm, that the people of France (Third Estate) would be able to ensure harmony between the three estates, that is clergy, nobility and the people. Despite this she expresses loyalty for the ministers Jacques Necker and Charles Alexandre de Calonne. De Gouges opposes absolutism, but believed France should retain a constitutional monarchy.

In her open letter to Marie-Antoinette, de Gouges declared:

I could never convince myself that a princess, raised in the midst of grandeur, had all the vices of baseness... Madame, may a nobler function characterize you, excite your ambition, and fix your attention. Only one whom chance had elevated to an eminent position can assume the task of lending weight to the progress of the Rights of Woman and of hastening its success. If you were less well informed, Madame, I might fear that your individual interests would outweigh those of your sex. You love glory; think, Madame, the greatest crimes immortalize one as much as the greatest virtues, but what a different fame in the annals of history! The one is ceaselessly taken as an example, and the other is eternally the execration of the human race.

Public letters, or pamphlets, were the primary means for the working class and women writers to engage in the public debate of revolutionary France. The intention was not to court the favour of the addressee, often a public figure. Frequently these pamphlets were intended to stir up public anger. They were widely circulated within and outside France. De Gouges's contemporary Madame Roland of the Gironde party became notorious for her Letter to Louis XVI in 1792. In the same year de Gouges penned Letter to Citizen Robespierre, which Maximilien Robespierre refused to answer. De Gouges took to the street, and on behalf of the French people proclaimed "Let us plunge into the Seine! Thou hast need of a bath ... thy death will claim things, and as for myself, the sacrifice of a pure life will disarm the heavens."

== Legacy ==
Although she was a celebrity in her lifetime and a prolific author, de Gouges became largely forgotten, but then rediscovered through a political biography by Olivier Blanc in the mid-1980s.

On 6 March 2004, the junction of the Rues Béranger, Charlot, de Turenne, and de Franche-Comté in Paris was proclaimed the Place Olympe de Gouges. The square was inaugurated by the mayor of the 3rd arrondissement, Pierre Aidenbaum, along with then first deputy mayor of Paris, Anne Hidalgo. The actress Véronique Genest read an excerpt from the Declaration of the Rights of Woman. 2007 French presidential contender Ségolène Royal expressed the wish that de Gouges's remains be moved to the Panthéon. However, her remains—like those of the other victims of the Reign of Terror—have been lost through burial in communal graves, so any reburial (like that of Marquis de Condorcet) would be only ceremonial.

She is honoured in many street names across France, in the Salle Olympe de Gouges exhibition hall in rue Merlin, Paris, and the Parc Olympe de Gouges in Annemasse.

The 2018 play The Revolutionists by Lauren Gunderson centers on de Gouges and a dramatized version of her life as a playwright and activist during the Reign of Terror.

== Portrayals ==
- The Revolutionists, play by Lauren Gunderson which premiered at Cincinnati Playhouse in the Park in February 2016 with Lise Bruneau in the role of Olympe ·
- Flashback, a Caroline Vigneaux film released in November 2021 on Amazon Prime Video with Sylvie Testud in the role of de Gouges.
- Olympe, play by Frank Salin where she is interpreted on stage by Firmine Richard at the Festival d'Avignon ("Off" Festival) in July 2024.
- Olympe, une femme dans la Révolution [Olympe, a woman in the Revolution] TV movie by Matthieu Busson and Julie Gayet, where she is portrayed by Julie Gayet (2024).

== Selected works ==
- Zamore et Mirza, ou l’heureux naufrage (Zamore and Mirza, or the Happy Shipwreck) 1784
- Le Mariage inattendu de Chérubin (The Unexpected Marriage of Cherubin) 1786
- L’Homme généreux (The Generous Man) 1786
- Molière chez Ninon, ou le siècle des grands hommes (Molière at Ninon, or the Century of Great Men) 1788
- Réflexions sur les hommes nègres (1788) (Wikisource)
- Les Démocrates et les aristocrates (The Democrats and the Aristocrats) 1790
- La Nécessité du divorce (The Necessity of Divorce) 1790
- Le Couvent (The Convent) 1790
- Mirabeau aux Champs Élysées (Mirabeau at the Champs Élysées) 1791
- La France sauvée, ou le tyran détrôné (France saved, or the Dethroned Tyrant) 1792
- L'Entrée de Dumouriez à Bruxelles (The Entrance of Dumouriez in Brussels) 1793

== See also ==
- List of civil rights leaders
- List of women's rights activists
- The Women's March on Versailles
- Women's Petition to the National Assembly
