= Diosmetin =

- Diosmetin structure

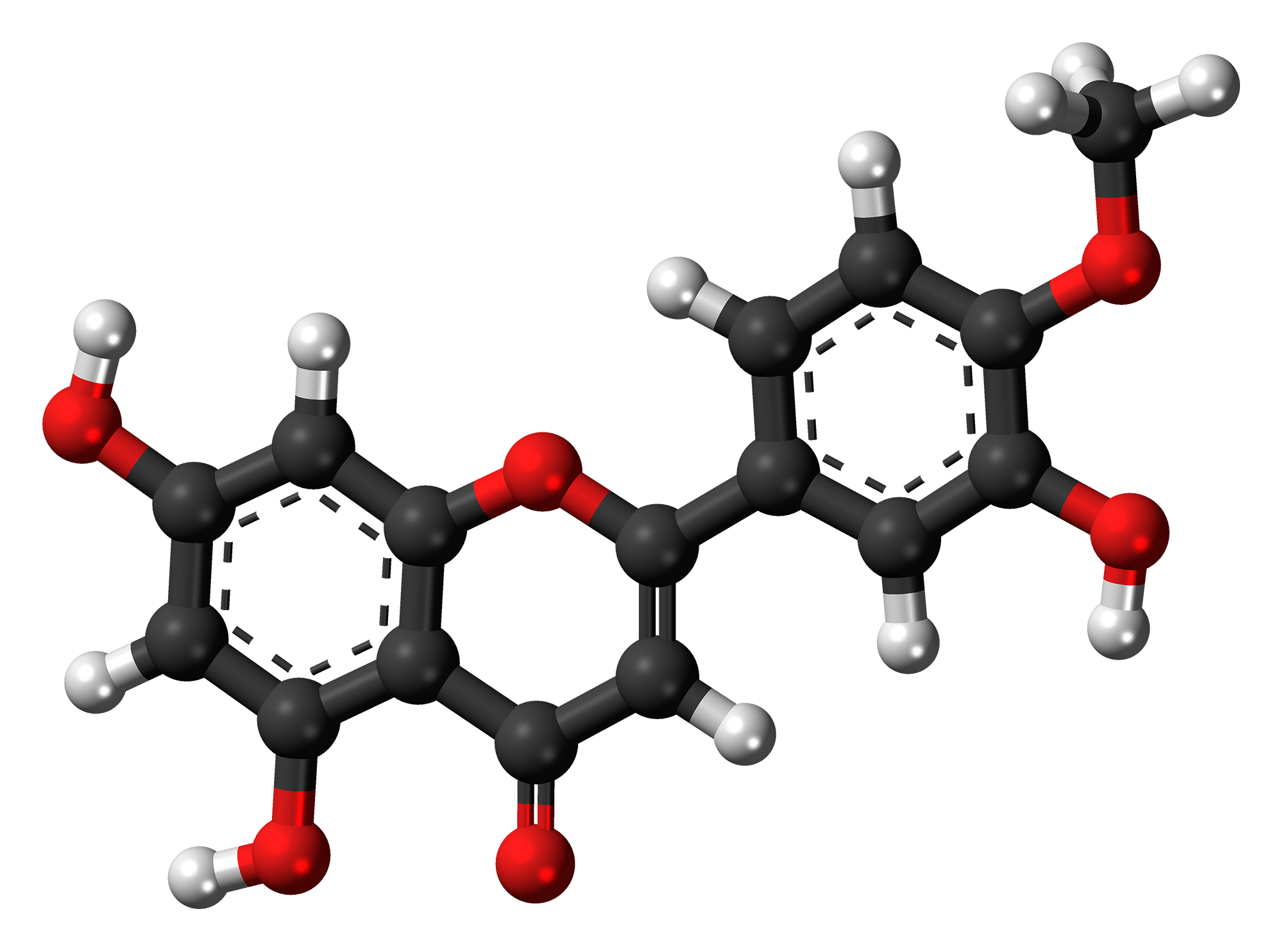

Names
- IUPAC name 3′,5,7-Trihydroxy-4′-methoxyflavone
- Systematic IUPAC name 5,7-Dihydroxy-2-(3-hydroxy-4-methoxyphenyl)-4H-benzopyran-4-one
- Other names Luteolin 4′-methyl ether

Identifiers
| CAS Number | 520-34-3 |
| 3D model (JSmol) | Interactive image |
| ChEBI | CHEBI:4630 |
| ChEMBL | ChEMBL90568 |
| ChemSpider | 4444931 |
| ECHA InfoCard | 100.007.539 |
| PubChem CID | 5281612 |
| UNII | TWZ37241OT |
| CompTox Dashboard (EPA) | DTXSID80199966 |
- InChI: InChI=1S/C16H12O6/c1-21-13-3-2-8(4-10(13)18)14-7-12(20)16-11(19)5-9(17)6-15(16)22-14/h2-7,17-19H,1H3 Key: MBNGWHIJMBWFHU-UHFFFAOYSA-N
- SMILES: COC1=C(C=C(C=C1)C2=CC(=O)C3=C(C=C(C=C3O2)O)O)O

Properties
| Chemical formula | C_{16}H_{12}O_{6} |
| Molar mass | 300.26 g/mol |
- Except where otherwise noted, data are given for materials in their standard state (at 25 °C [77 °F], 100 kPa). verify (what is ?) Infobox references

Diosmetin, also known as 5,7,3′-trihydroxy-4′-methoxyflavone, is an O-methylated flavone, a chemical compound that can be found in the Caucasian vetch.

It has been found to act as a weak TrkB receptor agonist.

== Glycosides ==
Diosmetin is the aglycone of diosmin.

== See also ==
- Tropomyosin receptor kinase B § Agonists
