= Anatole Bailly =

French Hellenist (1833–1911)

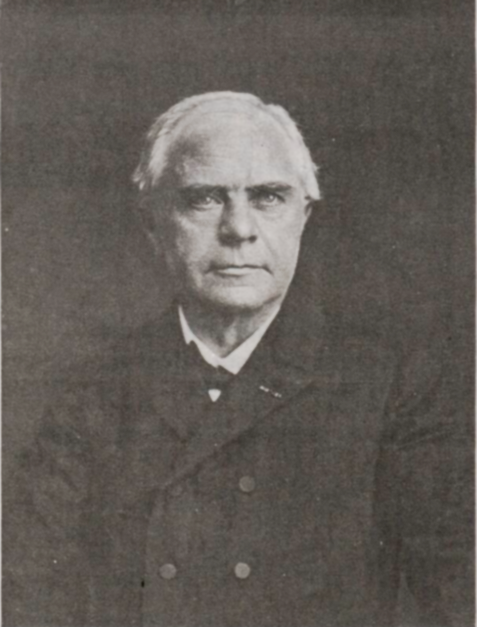
Anatole Bailly

Anatole Bailly (French: [bɑji]; 16 December 1833 – 12 December 1911) was a French Hellenist. He is author of the famous Dictionnaire grec-français ("Greek-French Dictionary"), which was published in 1895.

== Biography ==
Anatole Bailly was born in Orléans on 16 December 1833 to a family of moderate wealth – his father was a director of the auditing company L'Orléanaise and his mother ran a small store selling groceries, fruit and sewing supplies. He studied at a college in Orléans and obtained a bachelor of letters. He was then sent to Paris to prepare for entry into the École Normale Supérieure in a private institution, which he graduated from in 1853.

Anatole Bailly began his career in education as a substitute at the lycée in Lyon. There he successfully achieved the agrégation de grammaire. Named a professor at the lycée in Lyon, he left this city in 1859 for a job at the Lycée Louis-le-Grand in Paris. In 1861 he was hired by the Lycée Pothier in Orléans, his home town. He spent the rest of his career in this post, from which he retired in 1889.

A competent and conscientious, but very modest, professor, Bailly authored numerous textbooks, grammars and dictionaries of Greek and Latin which were popular in French schools at the end of the 19th century. He was equally interested in history and wrote many biographical accounts of overlooked people from Orléans. He became a member of scholarly societies of Orléans: the Société d'Agriculture, Sciences, Belles-lettres et Arts d'Orléans and the Société archéologique et historique de l'Orléanais. At a national level, he was a member of the Conseil académique de Paris, and the Association pour l'encouragement des études grecques en France (from its foundation in 1867), in addition to being appointed a correspondent of the Institut de France in the Académie des inscriptions et belles-lettres in 1889. Among other roles, Bailly was an officer of the Académie, a knight of the Légion d'honneur, and a knight of the royal order of the Sauveur de Grèce.

After the publication in 1885 of the Dictionnaire étymologique latin which he co-authored with Michel Bréal, Bailly completed the Dictionnaire grec-français with the assistance of Émile Egger in 1895. This last work assured his scholarly reputation. The abridged version, which was about half the length of the original, appeared in 1901. He was in the process of producing a revised edition of what would come to be known as Le Bailly, when he died suddenly on 12 December 1911 in his family home in Orléans, in which he had spent the greater part of his life – he is buried in the city's Main Cemetery.

== Legacy ==
A college in Orléans established in June 2008 is named in his honour.
