= Women's Petition to the National Assembly =

The Women's Petition to the National Assembly was produced during the French Revolution and presented to the French National Assembly in November 1789 after The March on Versailles on 5 October 1789, proposing a decree by the National Assembly to give women equality. There were thousands of petitions presented to the National Assembly and this one was not discussed. This petition showed how the authors were knowledgeable about the Declaration of the Rights of Man and of the Citizen which had been adopted in August 1789. They provided 6 pages of women's contributions and addressed gender roles and slavery.

== The petition ==
The authors acknowledge how the Declaration of the Rights of Man and of the Citizen, with its "paternal solicitude", makes it so that

"the poor villager is no longer obliged to grovel before the proud seigneur of his parish; the unfortunate vassal can halt in his tracks the impetuous boar that piteously ravaged his crops; the timid soldier dares to complain when he is run down by the splendid coach of the superb publican; the modest priest can sit down in ease at the table of his most illustrious and most reverend superior; . . . the black African will no longer find himself compared to a stupid animal which, goaded by the prod of a fierce driver, irrigates our furrows with his sweat and blood."

However, they were angered that women would be left out of being given rights and being able to partake in the reshaping of their country. They showed the inconsistency and hypocrisy of the Declaration:

"You have broken the scepter of despotism, you have pronounced the beautiful axiom [that] . . . the French are a free people. Yet still you allow thirteen million slaves shamefully to wear the irons of thirteen million despots! You have devined the true equality of rights—and you still unjustly withhold them from the sweetest and most interesting half among you!"

The petition was not well received - while there were some supportive members of the National Assembly, most argued that the women were out of their place and were suffering from the hysteria of a rapidly changing society. Because of the many repeated attempts at women's equality and suffrage that failed (including the Women's Petition to the National Assembly in November 1789), Olympe de Gouges (and many other contemporary feminists) brought feminism and the extension of egalité to women to the forefront of the debate surrounding the Revolution with documents such as the Declaration of the Rights of Woman and of the Female Citizen.

== Proposal for a decree ==
"The National Assembly, wishing to reform the greatest and most universal of abuses, and to repair the wrongs of a six-thousand-year-long injustice, has decreed and decrees as follows:"

1. Abolishment of male privilege throughout France.
2. Equal liberty, advantages, rights, and honors between the sexes.
3. Equal nobleness between the genders and sexes including grammatically.
4. The end of clauses stating "the wife is authorized by her husband" because there should be equality within the household.
5. Right for all to wear breeches.
6. End of degrading soldiers by having them wear women's clothing and instead be punished by declaring his gender neuter.
7. Admittance of the feminine sex to the district and departmental assemblies and "elevated to municipal responsibilities and even as deputies to the National Assembly." The consultative and deliberative voices of women.
8. Appointment of the feminine sex as Magistrates.
9. The same applies to all positions, compensations, and military dignities.
10. Entrance of the feminine sex into the sanctuary.

== See also ==
- Declaration of the Rights of Woman and of the Female Citizen
