= Daflon =

Micronized purified flavonoid fraction

Daflon is an oral micronized purified phlebotonic flavonoid fraction containing 90% diosmin and 10% hesperidin. It is manufactured by Laboratoires Servier and often used to treat or manage disorders of the blood vessels. Flavonoids are a type of phytochemical that have been associated with various effects on human health and are a component of many different pharmaceutical, nutraceutical, and cosmetic preparations. Diosmin is a flavone glycoside that is derived from hesperidin. Hesperidin is a flavone that is extracted from citrus fruits.

== Vein diseases and hemorrhoids ==
Daflon is not an FDA-approved medication, and therefore it cannot be advertised for treatment of diseases in the United States. Daflon is under preliminary research for its potential use in treating vein diseases, or hemorrhoids. It is sold as a drug in France, Spain, Malaysia, Portugal, Belgium and Egypt.

There is moderate certainty evidence for the effectiveness of daflon for slightly reducing oedema compared to placebo in the treatment of chronic venous insufficiency. Little to no differences in quality of life after treatment with Daflon were found and there is low certainty evidence that this class of drugs do not influence ulcer healing. Diosmiplex, a micronized purified flavonoid fraction of daflon, with similar venous insufficiency indication, is sold as a prescription medical food in the US.

== Pharmacological activity ==
Daflon plays a crucial role in the prevention of perivascular edema formation and treatment of venous stasis. This activity can be explained by its antagonist activity against prostaglandin E2 (PgE2) and thromboxane (TxA2) biosynthesis leading to inhibition of inflammatory process. Moreover, it also has a contraction activity on the lymphatic vessels which cause the lymphatic flow maximal.

== Dosage ==
For venous insufficiency, the dosage is 2 tablets of 500mg daily. For acute hemorrhoidal attack, the dosage is 6 tablets daily for 4 days, followed by 4 tablets daily over the next 3 days. For chronic venous disease, the dosage is 2 tablets a day for at least 2 months.

== Side effects ==
Possible side effects include routine gastric disorders and neurovegetative disorders, however, toxicology studies indicate that diosmin is quite safe. Diosmin interacts in an inhibitory manner with some metabolic enzymes so drug-interactions are probable.
