= Main Cemetery of Orléans =

Cemetery located in Loiret, in France

Coordinates: 47°55′04″N 1°54′36″E

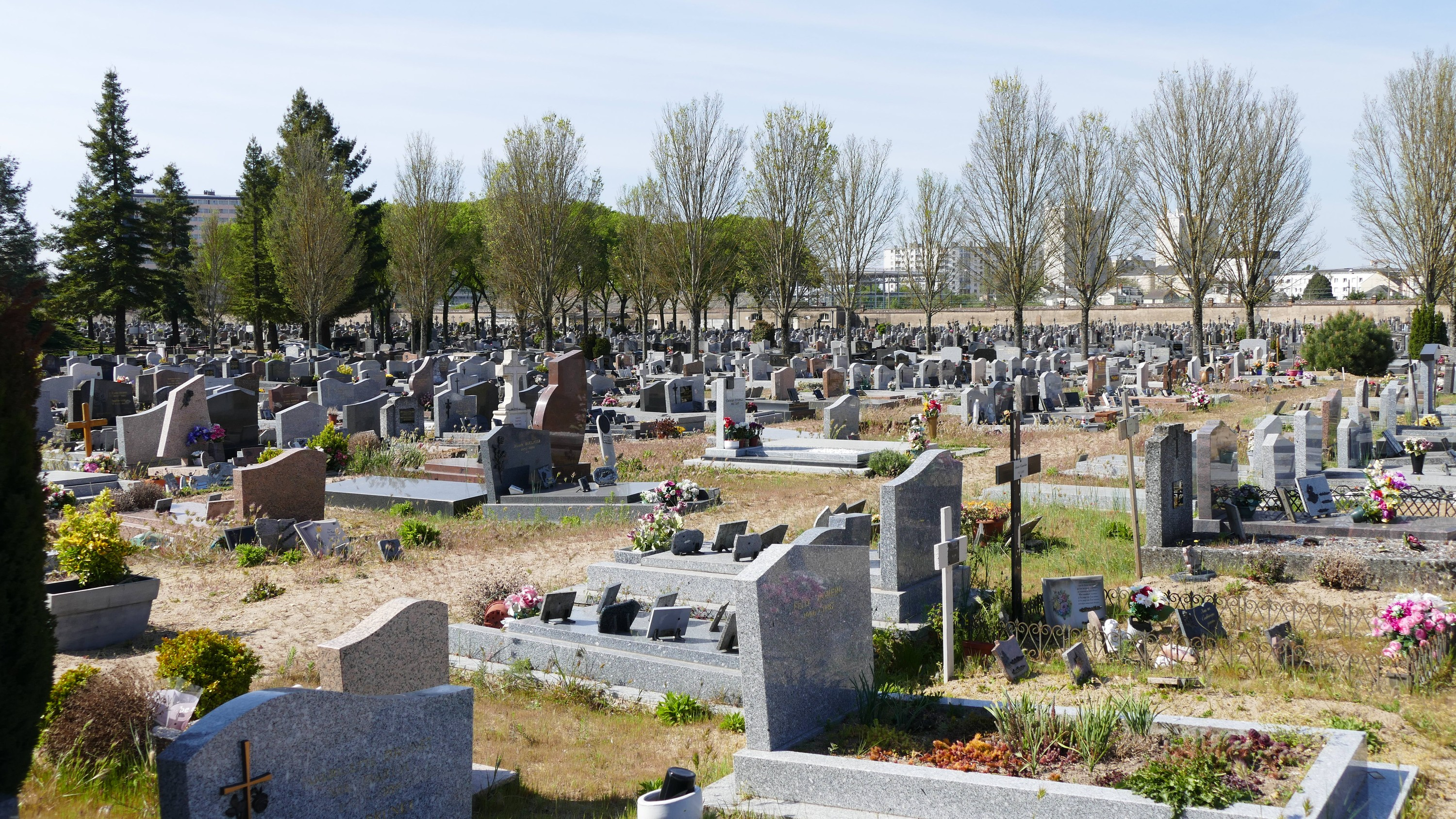

The Main Cemetery of Orléans (Grand cimetière d'Orléans) is the most important cemetery in Orléans and in the department of Loiret, France. Now measuring 15 hectares, it lies beside the railway line and its entrance is on boulevard Lamartine It includes a military square, an ossuary and a remembrance garden.

It opened in 1896 after the Saint-Jean and Saint-Vincent cemeteries were destroyed. Some tombs from those two previous cemeteries were moved there, such as that of the actor Abraham-Joseph Bénard. It is fish-shaped and lies on flat and sandy land. Other than the cross path and the main path, it has no trees.

Of the early graves, all that remains are a few funerary chapels of notable people near the entrance and a few tombs with medallions (including those of lieutenant-colonel Louis Beaugé and the aviator Serge Boineaud) in section A. The rest of the cemetery is covered in standardised modern tombs without distinctive or religious signs.

== Notable burials ==
- Anatole Bailly (1833-1911), hellenist, author of the famous Greek-French dictionary (chapel)
- Baron Pierre Bigot de Morogues (1776-1840), geologist, economist, peer of France
- Joseph-Abraham Bénard dit Fleury (1750-1822), actor
- Rémi Boucher de Molandon (1805-1893), local scholar, author of works on Joan of Arc (chapel)
- Abbé Edmond Desnoyers (1806-1902), historian, director of the city's archaeological museum and its musée Jeanne-d'Arc, founder of the Société archéologique de l'Orléanais (medallion)
- Gontran Gauthier (1906-1966), Compagnon de la Libération
- Jean-Baptiste Paillet (1784-1861), lawyer, co-author of the first edition of the manual of French law (sarcophagus)
- Charles Pensée (1799-1871), painter, illustrator
- Antoine Petit (1722-1794), physician and anatomist
- Fernand Rabier (1855-1933), radical-socialist deputy for Loiret, mayor of Orléans
- Louis Renouard (1835-1899), painter (bust)
- Louis Roguet (1824-1850), sculptor (column)
- Xavier Saint-Macary (1948-1988), actor (section C)
- Gabriel-François Serenne (1796-1882), philanthropist, founder of the city's orphanage named after him (obelisk)
- Roger Toulouse (1918-1994), painter
- Eugène Vignat (1815-1895), deputy for Loiret (pyramid)
- Jean Zay (1904-1944), Popular Front politician (cenotaph since his remains were moved to the Panthéon)
- Jacques Servier (1922-2014), physician, pharmacist, business owner and billionaire.
