= Diosmin =

Chemical compound

Clinical data
- AHFS/Drugs.com: International Drug Names
- Routes of administration: By mouth
- ATC code: C05CA03 (WHO)

Identifiers
- IUPAC name: 5-Hydroxy-2-(3-hydroxy-4-methoxyphenyl)- 7-[(2S,3R,4S,5S,6R)-3,4,5-trihydroxy -6-[[(2R,3R,4R,5R,6S) -3,4,5-trihydroxy-6-methyloxan-2-yl]oxymethyl]oxan-2-yl]oxychromen-4-one
- CAS Number: 520-27-4
- PubChem CID: 5281613
- DrugBank: DB08995
- ChemSpider: 4444932
- UNII: 7QM776WJ5N
- KEGG: D07858
- ChEBI: CHEBI:4631
- ChEMBL: ChEMBL231884
- CompTox Dashboard (EPA): DTXSID4045892
- ECHA InfoCard: 100.007.537

Chemical and physical data
- Formula: C_{28}H_{32}O_{15}
- Molar mass: 608.549 g·mol^{−1}
- 3D model (JSmol): Interactive image
- SMILES: O=C\4c5c(O)cc(O[C@@H]2O[C@H](CO[C@@H]1O[C@H]([C@H](O)[C@@H](O)[C@H]1O)C)[C@@H](O)[C@H](O)[C@H]2O)cc5O/C(c3ccc(OC)c(O)c3)=C/4
- InChI: InChI=1S/C28H32O15/c1-10-21(32)23(34)25(36)27(40-10)39-9-19-22(33)24(35)26(37)28(43-19)41-12-6-14(30)20-15(31)8-17(42-18(20)7-12)11-3-4-16(38-2)13(29)5-11/h3-8,10,19,21-30,32-37H,9H2,1-2H3/t10-,19+,21-,22+,23+,24-,25+,26+,27+,28+/m0/s1; Key:GZSOSUNBTXMUFQ-YFAPSIMESA-N

Diosmin (diosmetin 7-O-rutinoside), a flavone glycoside of diosmetin, is manufactured from citrus fruit peels as a phlebotonic non-prescription dietary supplement used to aid treatment of hemorrhoids or chronic venous diseases, mainly of the legs.

== Uses ==
Diosmin is a dietary supplement used to aid treatment of hemorrhoids and venous diseases, i.e., chronic venous insufficiency including spider and varicose veins, leg swelling (edema), stasis dermatitis and venous ulcers. The mechanism of action of Diosmin and other phlebotonics is undefined, and clinical evidence of benefit is limited. Diosmin is not recommended for treating the rectal mucosa, skin irritations, or wounds, and should not be used to treat dermatitis, eczema, or urticaria. Diosmin is not recommended for use in children or women during pregnancy. There is moderate-quality evidence that diosmin or other phlebotonics improved leg and ankle swelling and lower leg pain, and low-quality evidence for treating hemorrhoids.

=== Phlebotonics ===
Diosmin is included among a small class of agents called "phlebotonics" having heterogeneous composition and consisting partly of citrus peel extracts (flavonoids, such as hesperidin) and synthetic compounds, which are used to treat chronic venous insufficiency or hemorrhoids.

In 2017, the American Working Group in Chronic Venous Disease recommended use of micronized purified flavonoid fraction (diosmiplex) as a medical food for chronic venous disease symptoms and venous ulcers, having "beneficial outcomes without serious adverse events", alone or combined with compression therapy, concurring with the previous guidance of the International European Society for Vascular Surgery. The German Dermatological Society indicated that diosmin may be used with other treatments for symptoms of chronic venous diseases.

The American Society of Colon and Rectal Surgeons mentions phlebotonics as a possible treatment for symptoms of hemorrhoid grades I to II, as there is only moderate-quality evidence of effectiveness with "expectations of minimal harm", while having no evidence of long-term benefit. French, Indian, Portuguese, and Italian professional societies of coloproctology issued similar recommendations regarding phlebotonics for hemorrhoids.

Micronized purified flavonoid fraction (MPFF) has been studied as a venoactive treatment for hemorrhoidal disease. A 2020 systematic review identified 11 studies reported in 13 articles. The authors reported benefits for several signs and symptoms, including bleeding and overall improvement, although substantial heterogeneity among the studies limited the quantitative meta-analysis to four studies.

== Adverse effects ==
In some 10% of users, diosmin causes mild gastrointestinal disorders or skin irritations (hives, itching), stomach pain, nausea, heart arrhythmias, or anemia. Preliminary research indicates no evidence of toxicity. The US Food and Drug Administration (FDA) concluded in 2001 that there was inadequate evidence on which to base an expectation of safety. As of 2013, the FDA did not revise this position.

== Regulatory status ==
Diosmin is distributed in the U.S. as a dietary supplement called Daflon. Diosmin is not approved as a prescription drug in the United States, although it is available as over-the-counter or prescription-only drug in Europe sold under name Detralex among others. Phlebotonics are not approved in Germany, and are restricted in Spain only for the treatment of chronic venous diseases.

== See also ==
- Daflon
