= Jacques Servier =

French doctor and businessman

- Born: 9 February 1922; Vatan, France
- Died: 16 April 2014 (aged 92); Neuilly-sur-Seine, France
- Occupations: Businessman; Founder of Laboratoires Servier

Jacques Servier (9 February 1922 – 16 April 2014) was a French doctor and businessman. He was the founder and president of Laboratoires Servier, a pharmaceutical company.

== Biography ==
Founder of the pharmaceutical group Servier in 1954, he had a fortune estimated at US$7.7 billion.

The group led by him, Servier, had been convicted several times to pay damages for Mediator, trade name of benfluorex. There was a class action also for Isoméride, trade name of dexfenfluramine. There are also active discussions and trials around benfluorex.

He is buried in the Main Cemetery of Orléans.

== Decorations ==
- Legion of Honour
  - Knight (1976)
  - Officer (1 December 1987; by Minister of Social Affairs and Employment Philippe Séguin)
  - Commander (31 December 1992; by Minister for Foreign Trade Dominique Strauss-Kahn)
  - Grand Officer (25 March 2002; by President Jacques Chirac)
  - Grand Cross (31 December 2008; by President Nicolas Sarkozy)
- National Order of Merit
  - Officer (1981)
  - Commander (21 May 1985; by President François Mitterrand)
- Ordre des Palmes Académiques
  - Knight (1980)
  - Officer (1996)
