= Declaration of the Rights of Woman and of the Female Citizen =

1791 manifesto written by French feminist Olympe de Gouges

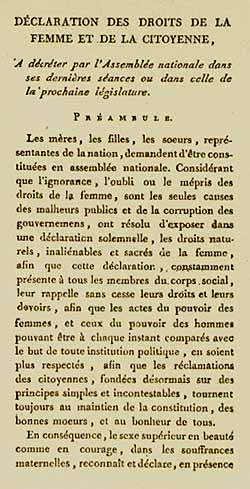
First page of Declaration of the Rights of Woman and of the Female Citizen

The Declaration of the Rights of Woman and of the Female Citizen (French: Déclaration des droits de la femme et de la citoyenne), also known as the Declaration of the Rights of Woman, was written on 14 September 1791 by French activist, feminist, and playwright Olympe de Gouges in response to the 1789 Declaration of the Rights of Man and of the Citizen. By publishing this document on 15 September, de Gouges hoped to expose the failures of the French Revolution in the recognition of gender equality. As a constitutional monarchist opposed to the execution of the King, de Gouges was accused, tried and convicted of treason, resulting in her immediate execution, along with other Girondists.

The Declaration of the Rights of Woman is significant because it brought attention to a set of what would later be known as feminist concerns that collectively reflected and influenced the aims of many French Revolutionaries and other contemporaries.

== Historical context ==
=== Previous attempts at equality ===
The Declaration of the Rights of Man and of the Citizen was adopted in 1789 by the National Constituent Assembly, during the French revolution. Prepared and proposed by the Marquis de Lafayette, the declaration said "all men are born and remain free and equal in rights". The Declaration of the Rights of Man and of the Citizen became a key human rights document. The Declaration exposed inconsistencies of laws that treated citizens differently on the basis of sex, race, class, or religion. Nicolas de Condorcet declared that "he who votes against the right of another, whatever the religion, color, or sex of that other, has henceforth abjured his own".

In October 1789, women in the marketplaces of Paris, rioting over the high price and scarcity of bread, began to march to Versailles, often called the Women's March on Versailles. While not solely an attempt for the extension of natural and political rights to women, the demonstrators believed that equality among all French citizens would extend those rights to women, political minorities, and landless citizens. Although upon the march, the king acknowledged the changes associated with the French Revolution and no longer resisted such liberal reforms, the leaders of the Revolution failed to recognize that women were the largest force in the march, and did not extend natural rights to women.

In November 1789, in response to both the Declaration of the Rights of Man and of the Citizen and the failure of the National Assembly to recognize the natural and political rights of women, a group of women submitted a petition for the extension of egalité to women, referred to as the Women's Petition to the National Assembly. While thousands of petitions were repeatedly submitted to the National Assembly, this one was never brought up or discussed.

=== The politics of Gouges ===
Olympe de Gouges was a French playwright and political activist whose feminist and abolitionist writings reached large audiences. She began her career as a playwright in the early 1780s, and as the political tensions of the French Revolution built, she became more involved in politics and law.

In 1788 she published Réflexions sur les hommes négres, which demanded compassion for the plight of slaves in the French colonies. For Gouges there was a direct link between the autocratic monarchy in France and the institution of slavery, she argued that "Men everywhere are equal… Kings who are just do not want slaves; they know that they have submissive subjects". She came to the public's attention with the play l'Esclavage des Noirs, which was staged at the famous Comédie-Française in 1785.

Gouges wrote her famous Declaration of the Rights of Woman and the Female Citizen shortly after the French Constitution of 1791 was ratified by King Louis XVI, and dedicated it to his wife, Queen Marie Antoinette. The French Constitution marked the birth of the short-lived constitutional monarchy and implemented a status based citizenship. Citizens were defined as men over 25 who were "independent" and had paid the poll tax. These citizens had the right to vote. Furthermore, active citizenship was two-tiered. Citizens were divided into two groups: those who could vote and those who were fit for public office. Women were by definition not afforded any of the rights of active citizenship. Like men who could not pay the poll tax, children, domestic servants, rural day-laborers, slaves, Jews, actors, and hangmen, women had no political rights. In transferring sovereignty to the nation, the constitution dismantled the old regime, but Gouges argued that it did not go far enough. This was followed by her Contrat social ("Social Contract," named after a famous work of Jean-Jacques Rousseau), proposing marriage based upon gender equality.

== The Declaration ==
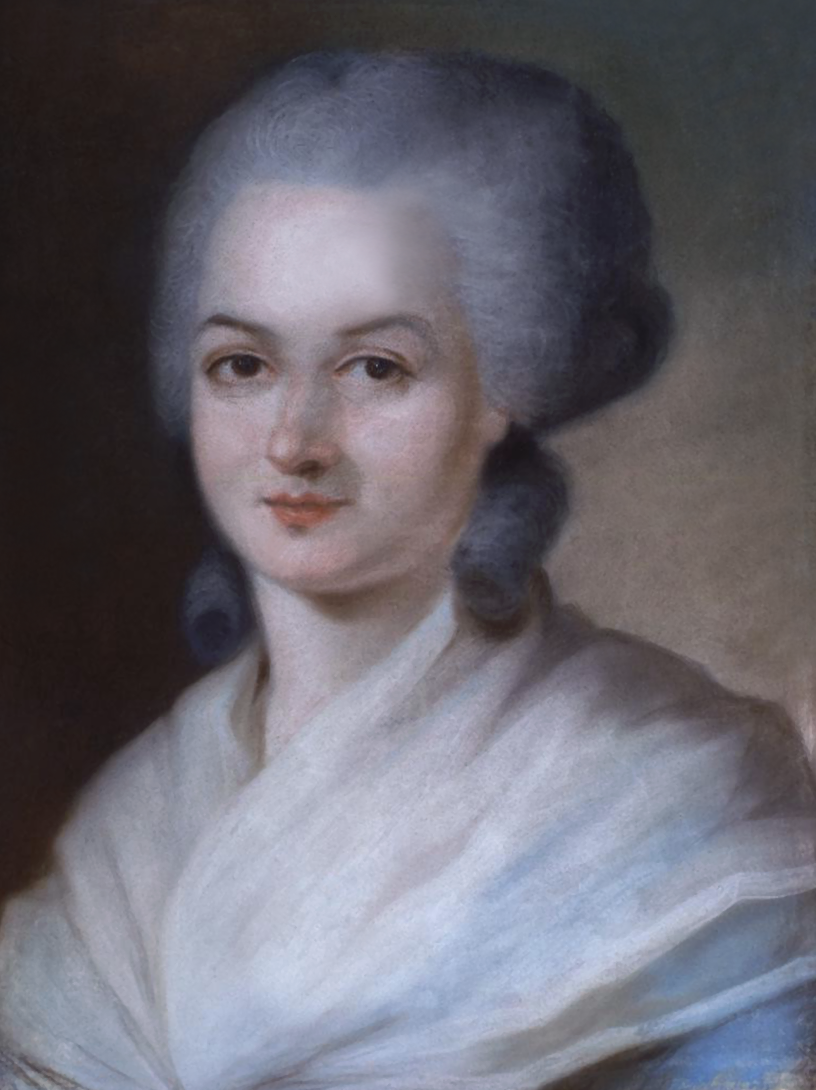
Olympe de Gouges

The Declaration of the Rights of Woman and of the Female Citizen was published on 15 September 1791. It is modeled on the Declaration of the Rights of Man and of the Citizen of 1789. Olympe de Gouges dedicated the text to Marie Antoinette, whom de Gouges described as "the most detested" of women. The Declaration states that "This revolution will only take effect when all women become fully aware of their deplorable condition, and of the rights they have lost in society".

The Declaration of the Rights of Woman and of the Female Citizen follows the seventeen articles of the Declaration of the Rights of Man and of the Citizen point for point. Despite its serious intent, it has been described by one writer, Camille Naish, as "almost a parody... of the original document".

=== Call to Action ===
De Gouges opens her Declaration with the famous quote, "Man, are you capable of being fair? A woman is asking: at least you will allow her that right. Tell me? What gave you the sovereign right to oppress my sex?" She demands that her reader observe nature and the rules of the animals surrounding them – in every other species, sexes coexist and intermingle peacefully and fairly. She asks why humans cannot act likewise and demands (in the preamble) that the National Assembly decree the Declaration a part of French law. Also they have seen many wars in combat with the men of France therefore they sought out rights for themselves.

=== Preamble to the Declaration ===
In the preamble to her Declaration, de Gouges mirrors the language of the Declaration of the Rights of Man and of the Citizen and explains that women, just as men, are guaranteed natural, inalienable, sacred rights – and that political institutions are instituted with the purpose of protecting these natural rights. She closes the preamble by declaring that "the sex that is superior in beauty as it is in courage during the pains of childbirth recognizes and declares, in the presence and under the auspices of the Supreme Being, the following Rights of Woman and the Female Citizen."

=== Articles of the Declaration ===
==== Article I ====
The first article of the Declaration of the Rights of Man and of the Citizen proclaims that "Men are born and remain free and equal in rights. Social distinctions may be based only on common utility." The first article of Declaration of the Rights of Woman and the Female Citizen responds: "Woman is born free and remains equal to man in rights. Social distinctions may only be based on common utility."

==== Article II ====
"The purpose of all political association is the preservation of the natural and imprescriptible rights of woman and man. These rights are liberty, property, security, and especially resistance to oppression".

==== Article III ====
"The principle of all sovereignty rests essentially in the nation, which is but the reuniting of woman and man. No body and no individual may exercise authority which does not emanate expressly from the nation".

==== Article IV ====
"Liberty and justice consist in restoring all that belongs to another; hence the exercise of the natural rights of woman has no other limits than those that the perpetual tyranny of man opposes to them; these limits must be reformed according to the laws of nature and reason".

In this statement, de Gouges is specifically stating that men have tyrannically opposed the natural rights of women, and that these limits must be reformed by the laws of a political organization in order to create a society that is just and protects the Natural Rights of all.

==== Article V ====
"The laws of nature and reason prohibit all actions which are injurious to society. No hindrance should be put in the way of anything not prohibited by these wise and divine laws, nor may anyone be forced to do what they do not require".

==== Article VI ====
"The law should be the expression of the general will. All citizenesses and citizens should take part, in person or by their representatives, in its formation. It must be the same for everyone. All citizenesses and citizens, being equal in its eyes, should be equally admissible to all public dignities, offices and employments, according to their ability, and with no other distinction than that of their virtues and talents."

De Gouges expands the sixth article of the Declaration of the Rights of Man and of the Citizen, which declared the rights of citizens to take part in the formation of law, to: "All citizens including women are equally admissible to all public dignities, offices and employments, according to their capacity, and with no other distinction than that of their virtues and talents."

==== Article VII ====
"No woman is exempted; she is indicted, arrested, and detained in the cases determined by the law. Women like men obey this rigorous law."

==== Article VIII ====
"Only strictly and obviously necessary punishments should be established by the law, and no one may be punished except by virtue of a law established and promulgated before the time of the offense, and legally applied to women".

==== Article IX ====
"Any woman being declared guilty, all rigor is exercised by the law".

==== Article X ====
"No one should be disturbed for his fundamental opinions; woman has the right to mount the scaffold, so she should have the right equally to mount the rostrum, provided that these manifestations do not trouble public order as established by law".

In Article X, de Gouges draws attention to the fact that, under French law, women were fully punishable, yet denied equal rights, declaring: "Women have the right to mount the scaffold, they must also have the right to mount the speaker's rostrum". This statement would go on to be well-known and spread to wide audiences.

==== Article XI ====
"The free communication of thoughts and opinions is one of the most precious of the rights of woman, since this liberty assures the recognition of children by their fathers. Every citizeness may therefore say freely, I am the mother of your child; a barbarous prejudice [against unmarried women having children] should not force her to hide the truth, so long as responsibility is accepted for any abuse of this liberty in cases determined by the law [women are not allowed to lie about the paternity of their children]".

De Gouges declares, in Article XI, that a woman should be allowed to identify the father of her child/children. Historians believe that this could relate to de Gouges' upbringing as a possible illegitimate child, and allows women to demand support from fathers of illegitimate children.

==== Article XII ====
"The safeguard of the rights of woman and the citizeness requires public powers. These powers are instituted for the advantage of all and not for the private benefit of those to whom they are entrusted".

This article explains that the declaration of these rights for women is a great benefit to society, and does not only benefit those protected by it. According to her biographer, Olivier Blanc, de Gouges maintained that this article be included to explain to men the benefit they would receive from support of this Declaration despite the advice to her of the Society of the Friends of Truth.

==== Article XIII ====
"For maintenance of public authority and for expenses of administration, taxation of women and men is equal; she takes part in all forced labor service, in all painful tasks; she must therefore have the same proportion in the distribution of places, employments, offices, dignities, and in industry".

==== Article XIV ====
"The citizenesses and citizens have the right, by themselves or through their representatives, to have demonstrated to them the necessity of public taxes. The citizenesses can only agree to them upon admission of an equal division, not only in wealth, but also in the public administration, and to determine the means of apportionment, assessment, and collection, and the duration of the taxes."

==== Article XV ====
"The mass of women, joining with men in paying taxes, have the right to hold accountable every public agent of the administration".

==== Article XVI ====
"Any society in which the guarantee of rights is not assured or the separation of powers not settled has no constitution. The constitution is null and void if the majority of individuals composing the nation has not cooperated in its drafting".

==== Article XVII ====
"Property belongs to both sexes whether united or separated; it is for each of them an inviolable and sacred right, and no one may be deprived of it as a true patrimony of nature, except when public necessity, certified by law, obviously requires it, and then on condition of a just compensation in advance".

The seventeenth article of the Declaration expresses sexual equality of marriage, and that upon marriage, women and men are found equal in the eyes of the law – this means that upon divorce, property is split evenly between the involved parties, and property cannot be seized without reason from women (as it is not seized from men).

=== Postscript to the Declaration ===
De Gouges opens her postscript to the Declaration with a declaration: "Woman, wake up; the tocsin of reason is resounding throughout the universe: acknowledge your rights." In her first paragraph, she implores women to consider what they have gained from the Revolution – "a greater scorn, a greater disdain." She maintains that men and women have everything in common, and that women must "unite under the banner of philosophy." She declares that whatever barriers women come up against, it is in their power to overcome those barriers and progress in society. She goes on to describe that "marriage is the tomb of trust and love" and implores men to consider the morally correct thing to do when creating the framework for the education of women.

De Gouges then writes a framework for a social contract (borrowing from Rousseau) for men and women, and goes into details about the specifics of the legal ramifications and equality in marriage. In many ways, she reformulates Rousseau's Social Contract with a focus that obliterates the gendered conception of a citizen and creates the conditions that are necessary for both parties to flourish.

According to de Gouges's journal, what ails government are fixed social hierarchies that are impossible to maintain. What heals a government is an equal balance of powers and a shared virtue. This is consistent with her continuing approval of a constitutional monarchy. Marriages are to be voluntary unions by equal rights-bearing partners who hold property and children mutually and dispense of same by agreement. All children produced during this union have the right to their mother’s and father’s name, "from whatever bed they come."

== Reactions to the Declaration ==
In response to the Declaration of the Rights of Woman and the Female Citizen, many of the radicals of the Revolution immediately suspected de Gouges of treason. The Jacobins (led by Robespierre), upon seeing that the Declaration was addressed to the Queen, suspected de Gouges (as well as her allies in the Girondists) of being Royalists. After de Gouges attempted to post a note demanding a plebiscite to decide between three forms of government (which included a Constitutional monarchy), the Jacobins quickly tried and convicted her of treason. She was sentenced to execution by the guillotine, and was one of many "political enemies" to the state of France claimed by the Reign of Terror.

At the time of her death, the Parisian press ceased to dismiss her as harmless. While journalists and writers argued that her programs and plans for France had been irrational, they also noted that in proposing them she had wanted to be a "statesman." Her crime, the Feuille du Salut public reported, was that she had "forgotten the virtues which belonged to her sex." In the environment of Jacobin Paris, her feminism and "political meddlings" were seen as a dangerous combination.

De Gouges was a strict critic of the principle of equality touted in Revolutionary France because it gave no attention to whom it left out, and she worked to claim the rightful place of women and slaves within its protection. By writing numerous plays about the topics of black and women's rights and suffrage, the issues she brought up were spread not only through France, but also throughout Europe and the newly created United States of America.

=== Reactions in other countries ===
==== United Kingdom ====
In the UK, Mary Wollstonecraft was prompted to write A Vindication of the Rights of Woman: with Strictures on Political and Moral Subjects in 1792. This was in response to both de Gouges' Declaration as well as Charles Maurice de Talleyrand-Périgord's 1791 address to the French National Assembly, which stated that women should only receive a domestic education. Wollstonecraft wrote the Rights of Woman to launch a broad attack against sexual double standards and to indict men for encouraging women to indulge in excessive emotion.

As opposed to de Gouges, Wollstonecraft does call for equality between the sexes in particular areas of life but does not explicitly state that men and women are equal. Her ambiguous statements regarding the equality of the sexes have made it difficult to classify Wollstonecraft as a modern feminist. Rights of Woman was relatively well received in 1792 England.

==== United States ====
While there were no immediate effects in the United States upon publishing of the Declaration of the Rights of Woman and of the Female Citizen, it was used extensively in the modeling of the Declaration of Sentiments, written by Elizabeth Cady Stanton and others at the Seneca Falls Convention, held in the summer of 1848. The Declaration of Sentiments, much like the Declaration of the Rights of Woman, was written in the style of the Declaration of the Rights of Man and of the Citizen which was written in the style of the United States Declaration of Independence.

== Analysis ==
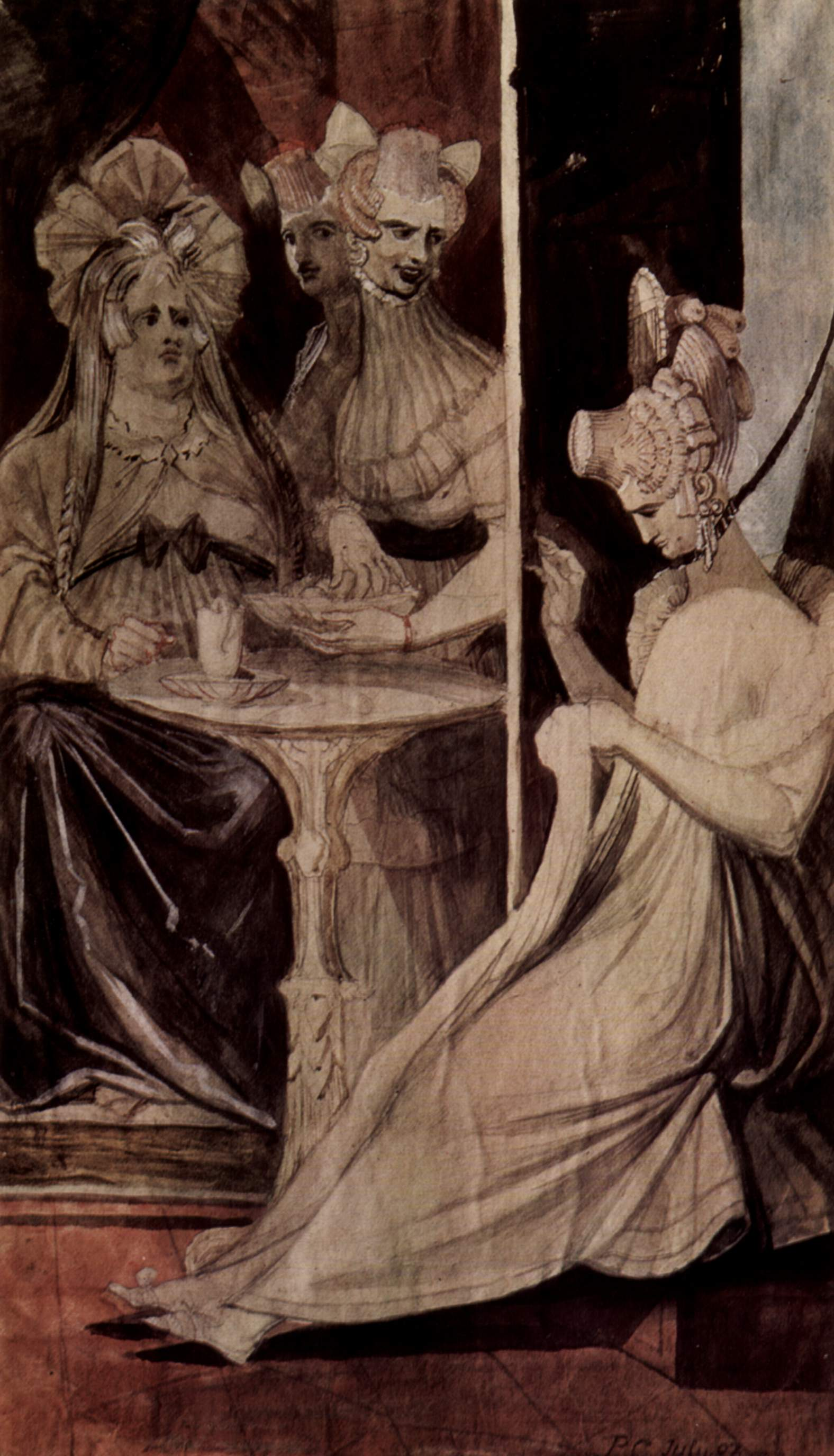
The Debutante (1807) by Henry Fuseli; "Woman, the victim of male social conventions, is tied to the wall, made to sew and guarded by governesses. The picture reflects Mary Wollstonecraft's views in The Rights of Women [sic]".

In her Declaration, de Gouges is forceful and sarcastic in tone and militant in spirit. For de Gouges, the most important expression of liberty was the right to free speech; she had been exercising that right her whole life. Access to the rostrum was another question, and one that she demanded be put at the forefront of the discussion about women's rights and suffrage.

The Enlightenment's presumption of the natural rights of humans (or inalienable rights as in the United States Declaration of Independence) is in direct contradiction with the beliefs of natural sexual inequality (sometimes called the "founding principles of nature"). The rights the equality of the French Declaration states, but does not intend, implies, according to de Gouges, the need to be recognized as having a more far-reaching application; if rights are natural and if these rights are somehow inherent in bodies, then all bodies are deserving of such rights, regardless of any particularities like gender or race.

De Gouges generally agreed with Jean-Jacques Rousseau and his understanding of how education of a nation could transform the society in which that nation resided. However, seeing well beyond Rousseau in terms of gender, she argued that the failure of society to educate its women was the sole cause of corruption in government. Her social contract, a direct appropriation of Rousseau, proclaims that the right in marriage to equal property and parental and inheritance rights is the only way to build a society of harmony.

At the time of the French Revolution, marriage was the center for political exploitation. In her Social Contract, de Gouges describes marriage as the "tomb of trust and love" and the place of "perpetual tyranny." The singly most common site of institutionalized gender inequality, marriage created the conditions for the development of women's unreliability and capacity for deception. In her Social Contract, many similarities to movements around the world become apparent. Similarly to how Mary Wollstonecraft explains marriage in A Vindication of the Rights of Woman (1792), de Gouges points to female artifice and weakness as a consequence of woman's powerless place in it. De Gouges, much like Wollstonecraft, attempts to combat societal and educational deficiencies: the vicious cycle which neglects to educate its females and then offers their narrower interests as the reason for the refusal of full citizenship. Additionally, both see the resulting fact of women’s "corruption and weak-mindedness" as a major source of the problems of society – and therein lies the solution, as well.

== See also ==
- The March on Versailles
- Women's Petition to the National Assembly
