= Abraham-Joseph Bénard =

French actor

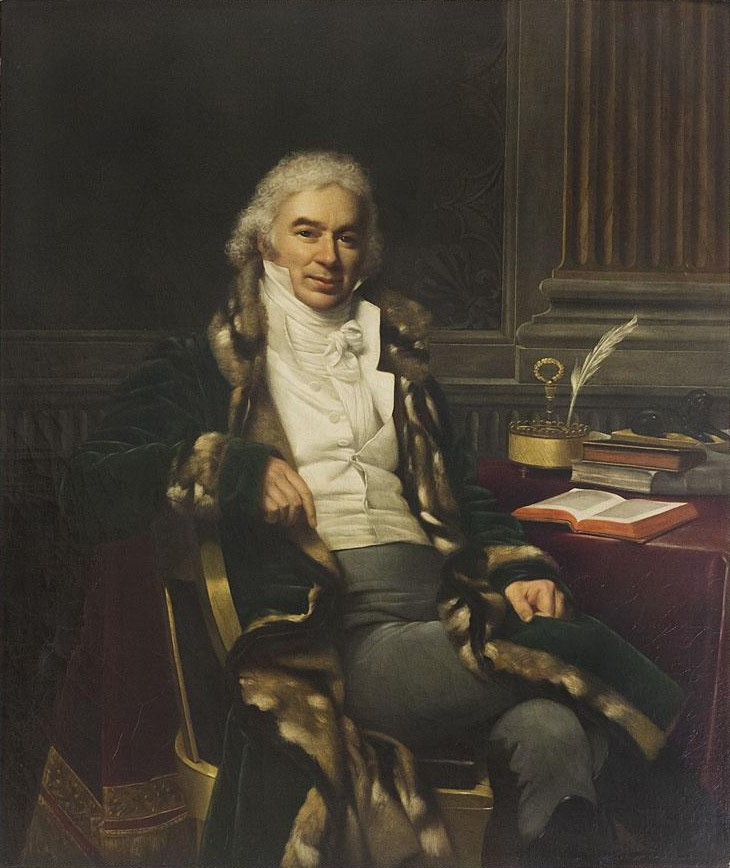
- Portrait of Fleury, 1818, by Adèle Romany
- Born: 26 October 1750
- Died: 3 March 1822 (aged 71)
- Resting place: Main Cemetery of Orléans
- Position held: Sociétaires of the Comédie-Française (1774–)

Abraham Joseph Bénard (October 26, 1750 – March 3, 1822), known as Fleury, was a French actor and comedian, known for acting at the Comédie-Française. He was born at Chartres, and began his stage apprenticeship at Nancy, where his father was at the head of a company of actors attached to the court of Stanisław Leszczyński. After four years in the provinces, he came to Paris in 1778, and almost immediately was made sociétaire at the Comédie Française, although the public was slow to recognize him as the greatest comedian of the day.

During the French Revolution, in 1793 Fleury, like the rest of his fellow-players, was arrested in consequence of the presentation of Laya's controversial L' Ami des lots ("The Friend of Laws"), and, when liberated, appeared at various theaters until, in 1799, he rejoined the rehabilitated Comédie Française. After forty years of service he retired in 1818. He was notoriously illiterate, and it is probable that the interesting Mémoire de Fleury owes more to its author, Lafitte, than to the subject whose "notes and papers" it is said to contain. He is buried in the Main Cemetery of Orléans.

== See also ==
- Troupe of the Comédie-Française in 1790
