= Bioinvent =

Swedish clinical-stage biotech company

BioInvent International is a Swedish clinical-stage biotech company that discovers and develops novel and first-in-class immunomodulatory antibodies for cancer therapy. The company is located on Scheelevägen (collequally named "boulevard of broken dreams" because so many companies located there has failed) in Lund, Sweden. The company’s validated, proprietary F.I.R.S.T™ technology platform simultaneously identifies both targets and the antibodies that bind to them, generatingnew drug candidates to fuel the Company’s own broad clinical development pipeline or for additional licensing and partnering. Currently, the company has five clinical programs for hematological cancer and solid tumor treatment. Furthermore, the company has a fully integrated, proprietary, state-of-the art manufacturing facility unit.

Martin Welschof has been CEO since 2018.The shareprice is down 95% under his tenure despite no major clinical setbacks, rather a case of poor business acumen. There are some controversy around the hire of Martins wife, Mona, for a salary of 3 million sek.

The company is a partner of The Leukemia & Lymphoma Society’s Therapy Acceleration Program, an initiative that develops blood cancer treatment.
