= Losartan =

Blood pressure medication

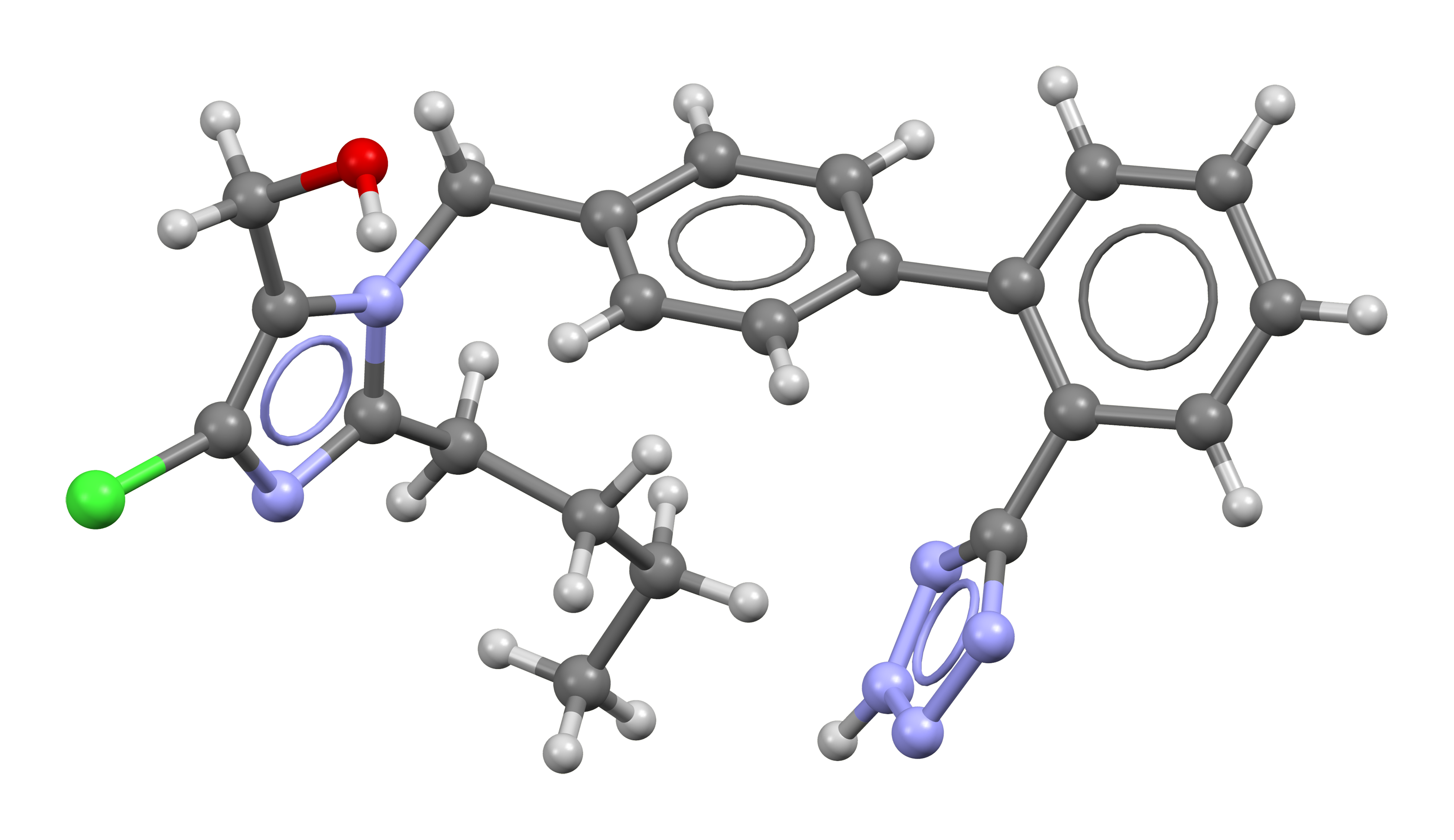

Clinical data
- Pronunciation: /loʊˈsɑːrtən/
- Trade names: Cozaar, others
- AHFS/Drugs.com: Monograph
- MedlinePlus: a695008
- License data: US DailyMed: Losartan
- Pregnancy category: AU: D
- Routes of administration: By mouth
- Drug class: Angiotensin II receptor antagonist
- ATC code: C09CA01 (WHO)

Legal status
- Legal status: US: ℞-only; In general: ℞ (Prescription only)

Pharmacokinetic data
- Bioavailability: 25–35%
- Protein binding: 99.7% (primarily albumin)
- Metabolism: Liver (CYP2C9, CYP3A4)
- Elimination half-life: 1.5–2 hours
- Excretion: Kidney 13–25%, bile duct 50–60%

Identifiers
- IUPAC name: (2-butyl-4-chloro-1-{[2'-(2H-tetrazol-5-yl)biphenyl-4-yl]methyl}-1H-imidazol-5-yl)methanol
- CAS Number: 114798-26-4
- PubChem CID: 3961
- IUPHAR/BPS: 590
- DrugBank: DB00678
- ChemSpider: 3824
- UNII: JMS50MPO89
- KEGG: D08146
- ChEBI: CHEBI:6541
- ChEMBL: ChEMBL191
- CompTox Dashboard (EPA): DTXSID7023227
- ECHA InfoCard: 100.110.555

Chemical and physical data
- Formula: C_{22}H_{23}ClN_{6}O
- Molar mass: 422.92 g·mol^{−1}
- 3D model (JSmol): Interactive image
- SMILES: CCCCc1nc(Cl)c(CO)n1Cc1ccc(-c2ccccc2-c2nn[nH]n2)cc1
- InChI: InChI=1S/C22H23ClN6O/c1-2-3-8-20-24-21(23)19(14-30)29(20)13-15-9-11-16(12-10-15)17-6-4-5-7-18(17)22-25-27-28-26-22/h4-7,9-12,30H,2-3,8,13-14H2,1H3,(H,25,26,27,28); Key:PSIFNNKUMBGKDQ-UHFFFAOYSA-N

Losartan, sold under the brand name Cozaar among others, is a medication used to treat high blood pressure (hypertension). It is in the angiotensin receptor blocker (ARB) family of medication, and is considered protective of the kidneys. Besides hypertension, it is also used in diabetic kidney disease, heart failure, and left ventricular enlargement. It comes as a tablet that is taken by mouth. It may be used alone or in addition to other blood pressure medication. Up to six weeks may be required for the full effects to occur.

Common adverse effects include muscle cramps, stuffy nose, dizziness, cough, high blood potassium, and anemia. Severe adverse effects may include angioedema, low blood pressure, and kidney problems. Use during pregnancy may result in harm to the baby. Use is not recommended during breastfeeding. It works by blocking angiotensin II.

Losartan was patented in 1986, and approved for medical use in the United States in 1995. It is on the World Health Organization's List of Essential Medicines. It is available as a generic medication. In 2024, it was the seventh most commonly prescribed medication in the United States, with more than 59 million prescriptions. A version combined with hydrochlorothiazide as a diuretic is available which, in 2023, was the 65th most commonly prescribed medication in the United States, with more than 9 million prescriptions.

== Chemistry ==
Losartan potassium is chemically described as 2-butyl-4-chloro-1-[p-(o-1H-tetrazol-5-ylphenyl)benzyl]imidazole-5-methanol monopotassium salt. Its empirical formula is C_{22}H_{23}ClN_{6}O, and its molecular weight is 422.9.

Losartan is generally marketed as the (basic) potassium salt of the aromatized negatively charged tetrazole, called "losartan potassium". The molecule has an extended biphenyl group with a tetrazole which is being used in place of the carboxylic acid as a bioisostere.

== Medical uses ==
Losartan is used for hypertension, including in people with left ventricular hypertrophy (enlarged heart muscle), and kidney dysfunction among type II diabetics. It may also delay progression of diabetic nephropathy. It is a suitable pharmacological agent for the reduction of kidney (renal) disease progression in patients with type 2 diabetes, hypertension, and microalbuminuria (>30 mg/24 hours) or proteinuria (>900 mg/24 hours).

Although evidence shows calcium channel blockers and thiazide-type diuretics are preferred first-line treatments for most people (due to both efficacy and cost), an angiotensin II receptor antagonist such as losartan is recommended as first-line treatment in people under the age of 55 who cannot tolerate an ACE inhibitor. One study demonstrated losartan was superior to atenolol in the primary prevention of adverse cardiovascular events (myocardial infarction or stroke), with a reduction in cardiovascular morbidity and mortality for a comparable reduction in blood pressure. The maximal effects on blood pressure usually occur within 3–6 weeks of starting losartan.

== Adverse effects ==
The most common adverse effects for losartan in adults are upper respiratory infections, dizziness, and back pain. People with type 2 diabetes and kidney disease may experience diarrhea, fatigue, low blood pressure, low blood glucose, elevated potassium, chest pain, or allergic reaction. Losartan should not be taken by people who are diabetic and taking aliskiren. Anemia may occur, due to inhibition of the renin–angiotensin system. As with other angiotensin receptor blockers, losartan may injure the liver, although this effect appears to be rare. Electrolyte imbalances may occur in people with kidney problems who take losartan. Adverse outcomes do not differ by sex, age, or race.

=== Pregnancy ===
In October 2014, the US Food and Drug Administration (FDA) issued a black box warning that losartan can cause fetal toxicity and should be discontinued as soon as pregnancy is detected. Using losartan while pregnant could result in fetal injury or death.

=== Overdose ===
Overdosing would most likely result in decreased blood pressure, which could manifest as an increased heart rate, dizziness, feeling lightheaded, or loss of consciousness. Mice studies showed that lethality occurred at about 44 to 170 times the maximum recommended dose after the mice weights were taken into account.

=== Interactions ===
Losartan may have adverse interactions with phenobarbital, rifampin, or fluconazole, possibly inhibiting its blood pressure-lowering effects.

=== Contamination ===
Between November 2018 and September 2019, the FDA announced multiple recalls of tablets containing losartan by Sandoz, Torrent Pharmaceuticals, Hetero Labs, Camber Pharmaceuticals, Legacy Pharmaceutical Packaging, Teva Pharmaceuticals, Vivimed Life Sciences, and Macleods Pharmaceutical Limited due to detection of one of the possible carcinogens N-nitrosodiethylamine, N-methylnitrosobutyric acid, or N-nitroso-N-methyl-4-aminobutyric acid in the active pharmaceutical ingredient (API).

== Mechanism of action ==
Renin-angiotensin-aldosterone system (RAAS)

Losartan is a selective, competitive angiotensin II receptor type 1 (AT_{1}) antagonist, reducing the end organ responses to angiotensin II. Losartan administration results in a decrease in total peripheral resistance (afterload) and cardiac venous return (preload). All of the physiological effects of angiotensin II, including the release of aldosterone, are antagonized in the presence of losartan. Reduction in blood pressure occurs independently of the status of the renin–angiotensin system. As a result of losartan dosing, plasma renin activity increases due to the removal of the angiotensin II feedback. Renin is released from the kidneys when there is reduced renal arterial pressure, sympathetic activation, or increased sodium delivery to the distal renal tubule. Renin then acts by converting angiotensinogen to angiotensin I; angiotensin-converting enzyme (ACE) converts angiotensin I to angiotensin II; angiotensin II causes vasoconstriction and aldosterone release. Aldosterone serves to retain sodium from the distal renal tubule. Sodium retention ultimately results in increased blood pressure. Therefore, the use of angiotensin II receptor antagonists like losartan results in blocking the downstream effect of renin, and angiotensin II, and ultimately decreasing blood pressure.

Angiotensin II receptor antagonists include losartan, valsartan, azilsartan, candesartan, eprosartan, irbesartan, olmesartan, and telmisartan. They all have the same mechanism of action and potentially inhibit the actions of angiotensin better than ACE inhibitors, such as lisinopril, because other enzymes than ACE have the capability of producing angiotensin II.

Losartan is a uricosuric. As a specific inhibitor of the urate transporter 1 (SLC22A12, URAT1), losartan blocks the uptake of uric acid into cells, thus leaving more available in the bloodstream to be filtered and excreted by the kidneys. Because losartan can cause hyperkalemia, individuals should not use potassium supplements or salt substitutes containing potassium without appropriate monitoring by a physician.

== Pharmacokinetics ==
Losartan is well absorbed following oral administration and undergoes significant first-pass metabolism to produce the 5-carboxylic acid metabolite, designated as EXP3174. About 14% of an oral dosage is converted to this metabolite, which is long-acting (6 to 8 hours) and a noncompetitive antagonist at the AT_{1} receptor, contributing to the pharmacological effects of losartan. EXP3174 is 10–40 times more potent in blocking AT_{1} receptors than losartan. In addition, the binding to the target enzyme is pH-sensitive, and the negatively charged tetrazole ring, which is similar in size to the negative carboxylic acid derivative, may contribute to the activity of the drug.

Losartan's bioavailability is about 33%.

Metabolism is primarily by cytochrome P450 isoenzymes CYP2C9 and CYP3A4. Peak plasma concentrations of losartan and EXP3174 occur about one hour and three to four hours, respectively, after an oral dose. Both losartan and EXP3174 are more than 98% bound to plasma proteins. Losartan is excreted in the urine, and in the feces via bile, as unchanged drug and metabolites. About 4% of an oral dose is excreted unchanged in urine, and about 6% is excreted in urine as the active metabolite. The terminal elimination half-lives of losartan and EXP3174 are about 1.5 to 2.5 hours and 3 to 9 hours, respectively.

Losartan and other angiotensin-receptor antagonists exhibit fetal toxicity and should be avoided during pregnancy, particularly in the second and third trimesters.
