= L-163,491 =

Chemical compound

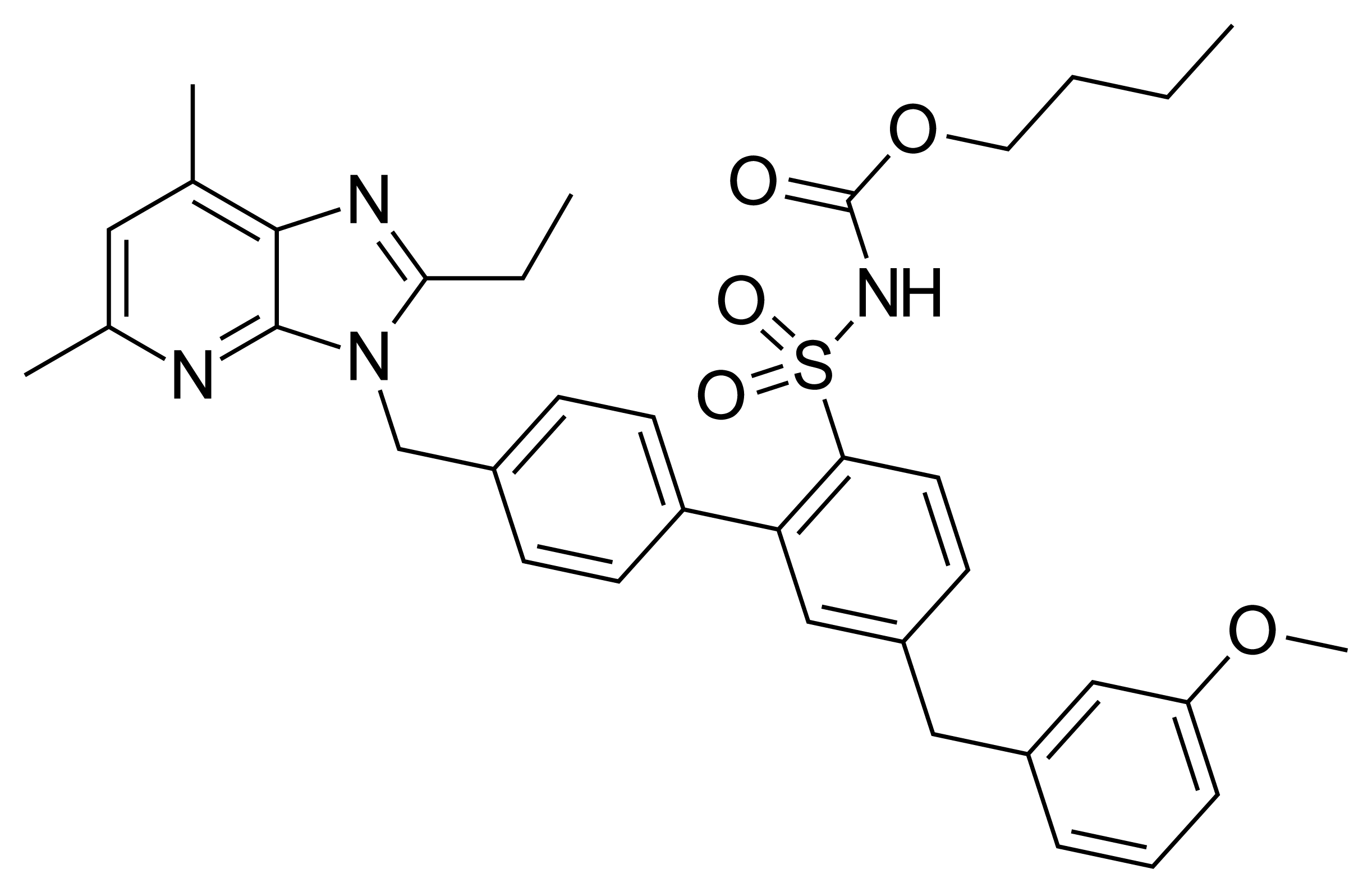

Legal status
- Legal status: US: Investigational drug

Identifiers
- IUPAC name: Butyl (4'-((2-ethyl-5,7-dimethyl-3H-imidazo[4,5-b]pyridin-3-yl)methyl)-5-(3-methoxybenzyl)-[1,1'-biphenyl]-2-yl)sulfonylcarbamate
- CAS Number: 170969-73-0
- PubChem CID: 9852384
- ChemSpider: ID8028096
- UNII: ZF8TN281W9
- ChEMBL: ChEMBL290214

Chemical and physical data
- Formula: C_{36}H_{40}N_{4}O_{5}S
- Molar mass: 640.80 g·mol^{−1}
- 3D model (JSmol): Interactive image
- SMILES: CCCCOC(=O)NS(=O)(=O)C1=C(C=C(C=C1)CC2=CC(=CC=C2)OC)C3=CC=C(C=C3)CN4C(=NC5=C4N=C(C=C5C)C)CC
- InChI: InChI=1S/C36H40N4O5S/c1-6-8-18-45-36(41)39-46(42,43)32-17-14-28(20-27-10-9-11-30(21-27)44-5)22-31(32)29-15-12-26(13-16-29)23-40-33(7-2)38-34-24(3)19-25(4)37-35(34)40/h9-17,19,21-22H,6-8,18,20,23H2,1-5H3,(H,39,41); Key:SRCIRAKBWHTYIX-UHFFFAOYSA-N

L-163,491 is an experimental drug which acts as a partial agonist of angiotensin II receptor type 1, and with lower affinity as an agonist of angiotensin II receptor type 2, mimicking the action of angiotensin II. Its practical applications to date have been limited to scientific research into the function of the angiotensin receptor system, but it has been suggested as a potential therapeutic agent for the treatment of inflammation of the lungs associated with certain viral diseases such as COVID-19.
