= Allisartan isoproxil =

Identifiers
- IUPAC name: Propan-2-yloxycarbonyloxymethyl 2-butyl-5-chloro-3-[[4-[2-(2H-tetrazol-5-yl)phenyl]phenyl]methyl]imidazole-4-carboxylate
- CAS Number: 947331-05-7
- PubChem CID: 24748496
- DrugBank: DB18880
- ChemSpider: 57583156
- UNII: DI4662MK4N

Chemical and physical data
- Formula: C_{27}H_{29}ClN_{6}O_{5}
- Molar mass: 553.02 g·mol^{−1}
- 3D model (JSmol): Interactive image
- SMILES: CCCCC1=NC(=C(N1CC2=CC=C(C=C2)C3=CC=CC=C3C4=NNN=N4)C(=O)OCOC(=O)OC(C)C)Cl
- InChI: InChI=1S/C27H29ClN6O5/c1-4-5-10-22-29-24(28)23(26(35)37-16-38-27(36)39-17(2)3)34(22)15-18-11-13-19(14-12-18)20-8-6-7-9-21(20)25-30-32-33-31-25/h6-9,11-14,17H,4-5,10,15-16H2,1-3H3,(H,30,31,32,33); Key:XMHJQQAKXRUCHI-UHFFFAOYSA-N

Allisartan isoproxil is an antihypertensive pharmaceutical drug. It belongs to the angiotensin II receptor blocker class of drugs. It is an esterified prodrug, and its metabolism results in the formation of a single metabolite, losartan carboxylic acid (EXP3174), an oxidized form of losartan.

Chemical structure of losartan carboxylic acid

In China, allisartan isoproxil was approved by the Chinese Food and Drug Administration for the treatment of hypertension in 2012, and introduced to the market in 2013.
