= Kinzhal =

Kinzhal may refer to:

- Khanjali, double-edged dagger
- Kh-47M2 Kinzhal, Russian ballistic missile
- 9K35 Kinzhal, a navalized version of the Tor missile system

== See also ==
- Kinzal, trade name of Telmisartan, a drug
