= ATIP =

ATIP may refer to:

- Absolute Time in Pregroove (ATIP), a method of storing information on an optical medium
- Access to Information and Privacy (ATIP) Act, Canadian law administered by the Treasury Board Secretariat
- Automated Track Inspection Program, of the U.S. Federal Rail Administration, using track geometry cars
- Atip, a type of roof found on bahay kubo
- A-type inclusion body protein (ATIP, ATI-P), a protein produced by cowpox
- Angiotensin 2 receptor-interacting protein (ATIP), also called MTUS1

== See also ==
- U.S. military Advanced Aerospace Threat Identification Program (AATIP)
- Atipa
- Atipi
- Tip (disambiguation)
