= Telmisartan/hydrochlorothiazide =

Chemical compound

Combination of
- Telmisartan: Angiotensin II receptor antagonist
- Hydrochlorothiazide: Thiazide diuretic

Clinical data
- Trade names: Micardis Plus, Micardis HCT, others
- AHFS/Drugs.com: Professional Drug Facts
- License data: US DailyMed: Telmisartan and hydrochlorothiazide
- Pregnancy category: AU: D
- Routes of administration: By mouth
- ATC code: C09DA07 (WHO)

Legal status
- Legal status: AU: S4 (Prescription only); CA: ℞-only; UK: POM (Prescription only); US: ℞-only; EU: Rx-only; In general: ℞ (Prescription only)

Identifiers
- CAS Number: 485391-74-0
- PubChem CID: 216293
- KEGG: D09219
- CompTox Dashboard (EPA): DTXSID30964080

Chemical and physical data
- Formula: C_{40}H_{38}ClN_{7}O_{6}S_{2}
- Molar mass: 812.36 g·mol^{−1}
- 3D model (JSmol): Interactive image
- SMILES: CCCC1=NC2=C(N1CC3=CC=C(C=C3)C4=CC=CC=C4C(=O)O)C=C(C=C2C)C5=NC6=CC=CC=C6N5C.C1NC2=CC(=C(C=C2S(=O)(=O)N1)S(=O)(=O)N)Cl
- InChI: InChI=1S/C33H30N4O2.C7H8ClN3O4S2/c1-4-9-30-35-31-21(2)18-24(32-34-27-12-7-8-13-28(27)36(32)3)19-29(31)37(30)20-22-14-16-23(17-15-22)25-10-5-6-11-26(25)33(38)39;8-4-1-5-7(2-6(4)16(9,12)13)17(14,15)11-3-10-5/h5-8,10-19H,4,9,20H2,1-3H3,(H,38,39);1-2,10-11H,3H2,(H2,9,12,13); Key:OZCVMXDGSSXWFT-UHFFFAOYSA-N

Telmisartan/hydrochlorothiazide, sold under the brand name Micardis HCT among others, is a fixed-dose combination medication used to treat high blood pressure. It is a combination of telmisartan an angiotensin II receptor antagonist with hydrochlorothiazide a diuretic. It may be used if telmisartan by itself is not sufficient. It is taken by mouth.

Common side effects include dizziness, upper respiratory tract infections, nausea, diarrhea, and tiredness. Severe side effects may include kidney problems, electrolyte problems, and allergic reactions. Use during pregnancy may harm the baby. Telmisartan works by blocking the effects of angiotensin II while hydrochlorothiazide works by decreasing the kidneys' ability to retain water.

The combination was approved for medical use in the United States in November 2000, and in the European Union in April 2002. The combination is on the World Health Organization's List of Essential Medicines. It is available as a generic medication.
