= ARBS =

ARBS may refer to:

- AN/ASB-19 Angle Rate Bombing System – an avionics weapon system
- Angiotensin II receptor blockers – a group of pharmaceuticals
- Associate of the Royal British Society of Sculptors (Since 2014 replaced by MRBS)
- Animal Revolt Battle Simulator
