= Telmisartan/amlodipine =

Combination drug

Combination of
- Telmisartan: Angiotensin II receptor antagonist
- Amlodipine: Calcium channel blocker

Clinical data
- Trade names: Twynsta, others
- License data: US DailyMed: Telmisartan and amlodipine
- Routes of administration: By mouth
- ATC code: C09DB04 (WHO)

Legal status
- Legal status: AU: S4 (Prescription only); CA: ℞-only; US: ℞-only

Identifiers
- CAS Number: 2087526-77-8
- KEGG: D09743

Telmisartan/amlodipine, sold under the brand name Twynsta among others, is a fixed-dose combination medication used to treat high blood pressure. It is a combination of telmisartan, an angiotensin II receptor antagonist; and amlodipine, as the besilate, a calcium channel blocker. It is taken by mouth.

Common side effects include dizziness, swelling, and back pain. Severe side effects may include low blood pressure, kidney problems, electrolyte problems, and a heart attack. Use during pregnancy may harm the baby. Telmisartan works by blocking the effects of angiotensin II while amlodipine works by decreasing calcium ion entry into smooth muscle and heart muscle.

The combination was approved for medical use in the United States in 2009. The combination is on the World Health Organization's List of Essential Medicines. It is available as a generic medication.
