= Saralasin =

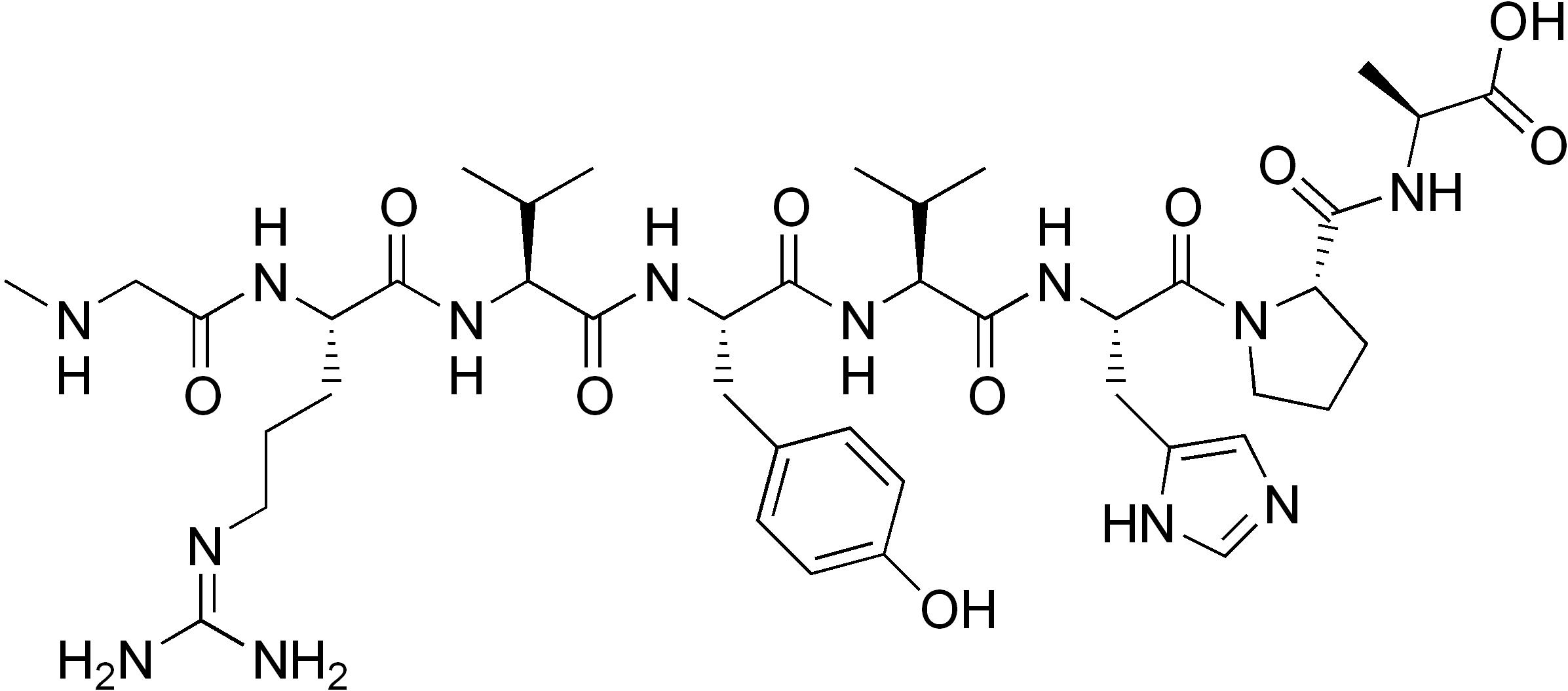

Names
- IUPAC name (2S)-2-[[(2S)-1-[(2S)-2-[[(2S)-2-[[(2S)-2-[[(2S)-2-[[(2S)-5-(diaminomethylideneamino)-2-[[2-(methylamino)acetyl]amino]pentanoyl]amino]-3-methylbutanoyl]amino]-3-(4-hydroxyphenyl)propanoyl]amino]-3-methylbutanoyl]amino]-3-(1H-imidazol-5-yl)propanoyl]pyrrolidine-2-carbonyl]amino]propanoic acid
- Other names Sar-Arg-Val-Tyr-Val-His-Pro-Ala

Identifiers
CAS Number	34273-10-4
3D model (JSmol)	Interactive image
ChEMBL	ChEMBL938; ChEMBL1200670
ChemSpider	4884380
PubChem CID	6324663
UNII	H2AFV2HE66
CompTox Dashboard (EPA)	DTXSID2046549
- InChI: InChI=1S/C42H65N13O10/c1-22(2)33(53-35(58)28(50-32(57)20-45-6)9-7-15-47-42(43)44)38(61)51-29(17-25-11-13-27(56)14-12-25)36(59)54-34(23(3)4)39(62)52-30(18-26-19-46-21-48-26)40(63)55-16-8-10-31(55)37(60)49-24(5)41(64)65/h11-14,19,21-24,28-31,33-34,45,56H,7-10,15-18,20H2,1-6H3,(H,46,48)(H,49,60)(H,50,57)(H,51,61)(H,52,62)(H,53,58)(H,54,59)(H,64,65)(H4,43,44,47)/t24-,28-,29-,30-,31-,33-,34-/m0/s1 Key: PFGWGEPQIUAZME-NXSMLHPHSA-N; InChI=1/C42H65N13O10/c1-22(2)33(53-35(58)28(50-32(57)20-45-6)9-7-15-47-42(43)44)38(61)51-29(17-25-11-13-27(56)14-12-25)36(59)54-34(23(3)4)39(62)52-30(18-26-19-46-21-48-26)40(63)55-16-8-10-31(55)37(60)49-24(5)41(64)65/h11-14,19,21-24,28-31,33-34,45,56H,7-10,15-18,20H2,1-6H3,(H,46,48)(H,49,60)(H,50,57)(H,51,61)(H,52,62)(H,53,58)(H,54,59)(H,64,65)(H4,43,44,47)/t24-,28-,29-,30-,31-,33-,34-/m0/s1 Key: PFGWGEPQIUAZME-NXSMLHPHBA
- SMILES: C[C@@H](C(=O)O)NC(=O)[C@@H]1CCCN1C(=O)[C@H](CC2=CN=CN2)NC(=O)[C@H](C(C)C)NC(=O)[C@H](CC3=CC=C(C=C3)O)NC(=O)[C@H](C(C)C)NC(=O)[C@H](CCCN=C(N)N)NC(=O)CNC

Properties
Chemical formula	C_{42}H_{65}N_{13}O_{10}
Molar mass	912.05 g/mol
- Except where otherwise noted, data are given for materials in their standard state (at 25 °C [77 °F], 100 kPa). verify (what is ?) Infobox references

Saralasin is a competitive angiotensin II receptor antagonist with partial agonistic activity. The aminopeptide sequence for saralasin differs from angiotensin II at three sites:

- At position 1, sarcosine replaces aspartic acid, thereby increasing the affinity for vascular smooth muscle AT II receptors and making sara resistant to degradation by aminopeptidases.
- At position 5, isoleucine is replaced by valine
- At position 8, phenylalanine is replaced by alanine which leads to a smaller stimulatory effect. Saralasin was used to distinguish renovascular hypertension from essential hypertension before its discontinuation in January 1984 because of many false-positive and false-negative reports.
