= Fimasartan =

Chemical compound

Clinical data
- Trade names: Kanarb
- ATC code: C09CA10 (WHO)

Identifiers
- IUPAC name: 2-(2-Butyl-4-methyl-6-oxo-1-{[2'-(1H-tetrazol-5-yl)-4-biphenylyl]methyl}-1,6-dihydro-5-pyrimidinyl)-N,N-dimethylethanethioamide
- CAS Number: 247257-48-3
- PubChem CID: 9870652
- ChemSpider: 8046343
- UNII: P58222188P
- KEGG: D10556
- ChEMBL: ChEMBL1951143
- CompTox Dashboard (EPA): DTXSID80179460

Chemical and physical data
- Formula: C_{27}H_{31}N_{7}OS
- Molar mass: 501.65 g·mol^{−1}
- 3D model (JSmol): Interactive image
- SMILES: CCCCC1=NC(=C(C(=O)N1CC2=CC=C(C=C2)C3=CC=CC=C3C4=NN=NN4)CC(=S)N(C)C)C
- InChI: InChI=1S/C27H31N7OS/c1-5-6-11-24-28-18(2)23(16-25(36)33(3)4)27(35)34(24)17-19-12-14-20(15-13-19)21-9-7-8-10-22(21)26-29-31-32-30-26/h7-10,12-15H,5-6,11,16-17H2,1-4H3,(H,29,30,31,32); Key:AMEROGPZOLAFBN-UHFFFAOYSA-N

Fimasartan is a non-peptide angiotensin II receptor antagonist (ARB) used for the treatment of hypertension and heart failure. Through oral administration, fimasartan blocks angiotensin II receptor type 1 (AT_{1} receptors), reducing pro-hypertensive actions of angiotensin II, such as systemic vasoconstriction and water retention by the kidneys. Concurrent administration of fimasartan with diuretic hydrochlorothiazide has shown to be safe in clinical trials. Fimasartan was approved for use in South Korea on September 9, 2010, and is available under the brand name Kanarb through Boryung Pharmaceuticals, who are presently seeking worldwide partnership.

== Mechanism of action ==
Fimasartan acts on the kidney's rennin-angiotensin cascade, which begins when renin release from the kidney causes the breakdown of angiotensinogen into angiotensin I. Angiotensin-converting enzyme (ACE) then catalyzes the reaction that forms angiotensin II, which acts on AT_{1} receptors on the blood vessels, heart, and kidneys. On blood vessels, the AT_{1} receptor is coupled to an intracellular pathway that causes smooth muscle contraction (vasoconstriction) of blood vessels.

In blocking the AT_{1} receptor, fimasartan inhibits vasoconstriction, favouring vasodilation. At the kidney and adrenal gland, AT_{1} blockage and prevention of aldosterone formation increase excretion of water and salt by the kidneys, which decreases overall blood volume. At the heart, AT_{1} blockage decreases contractility and the stimulatory effects of the sympathetic nervous system. Collectively, fimasartan leads to a reduction in blood pressure and alleviation of hypertensive symptoms. ARBs like fimasartan have also shown to be protective against stroke, myocardial infarction, and heart failure. Fimasartan has been shown to reduce cardiac hypertrophy, fibrosis, remodelling, and unnecessary cell proliferation via blockage of AT_{1} activation conceivably through decreased Endothelin 1 production, a result of AT1 activation. Fimastartan can also block TGF-β1 production (also AT_{1} dependent), which contributes to fibrosis and ventricular damage post-infarct. After ARB administration, mice showed improved prognosis after a myocardial infarction, though further studies still need to be done to assess fimasartan's specific effects on decreasing cardiovascular damage.

== Side effects ==
Side effects In clinical trials, fimasartan was well tolerated in all patients. However, higher dosing (360 mg/day) was accompanied by increased dizziness (most likely due to the momentary decrease in blood pressure) and headaches in a low number of patients. Other side effects such as diarrhea, syncope, and cold feet were also experienced in a low number of subjects, which all resolved without medical intervention.

== Pharmacology ==
Fimasartan is rapidly absorbed and has minimal accumulation in the body 7 days after administration. Fimasartan possesses a half-life of 9 to 16 hours, appropriate for daily dosing. Fimasartan was found to be effective in fasted or fed states, with a variety of dosing regimens. In trials, the maximum effects of the drug occurred slightly after the maximum plasma concentration (T-max) was achieved, which occurs 30 minutes to 3 hours after dosing. Fimasartan was found mostly in unmetabolized form in the plasma and in bile excretions. Urinary elimination of the drug was low, at less than 3% 24 hours after administration, entailing that the fimasartan does not undergo renal excretion.

== Society and culture ==
=== Brand names ===
The drug is also available in Russia as Канарб (Kanarb). Fimasartan is being marketed in India under the brand name of Fimanta and Fimagen through Ajanta Pharma Ltd.
