= Irbesartan =

Chemical compound

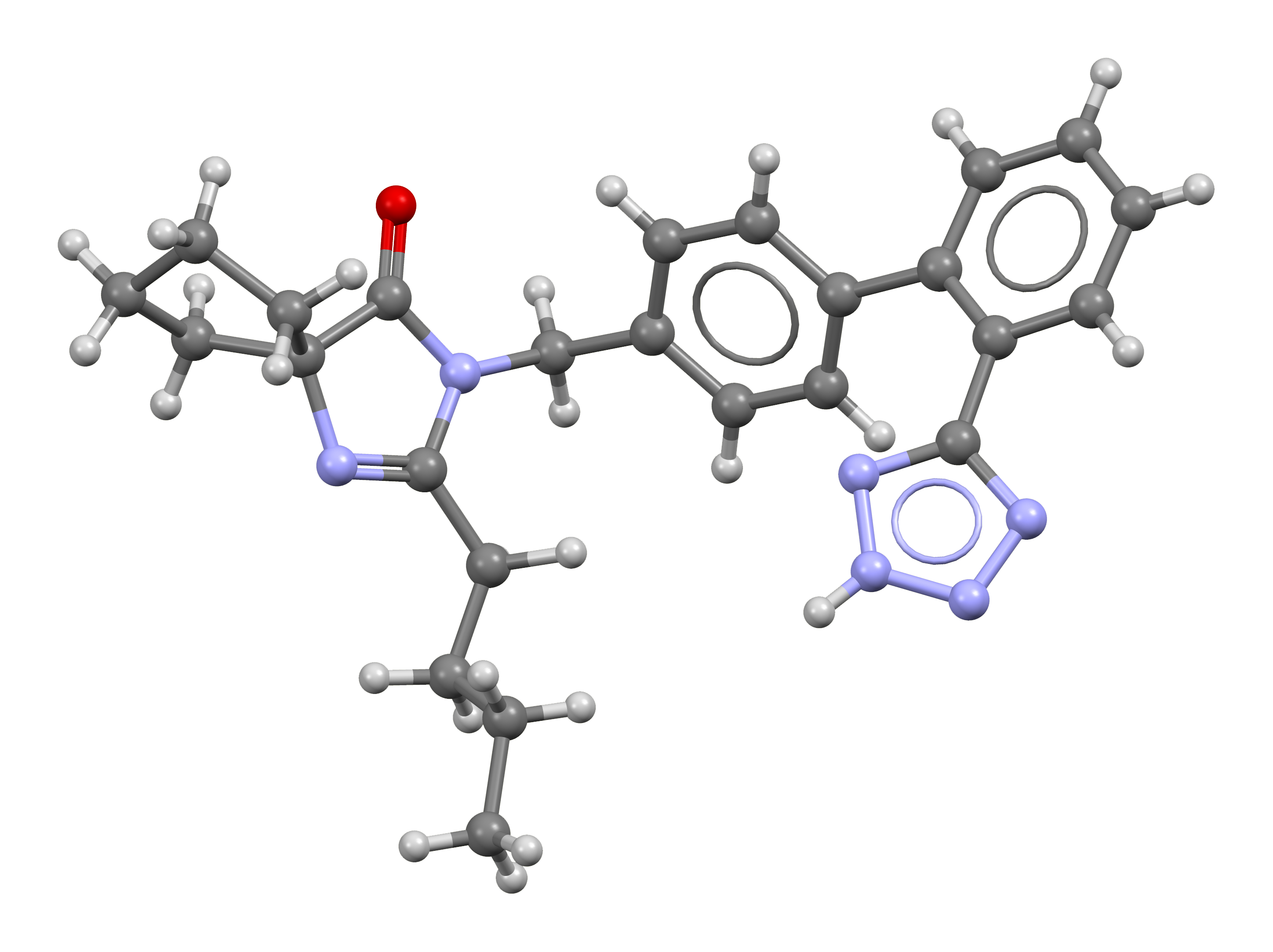

Clinical data
- Pronunciation: /ɜːrbəˈsɑːrtən/
- Trade names: Aprovel, others
- AHFS/Drugs.com: Monograph
- MedlinePlus: a698009
- License data: US DailyMed: Irbesartan
- Pregnancy category: AU: D
- Routes of administration: By mouth
- Drug class: Cardiovascular agent
- ATC code: C09CA04 (WHO) C09DA04 (WHO)

Legal status
- Legal status: AU: S4 (Prescription only); UK: POM (Prescription only); US: ℞-only; EU: Rx-only; In general: ℞ (Prescription only)

Pharmacokinetic data
- Bioavailability: 60% to 80%
- Protein binding: ~90%
- Metabolism: Liver (CYP2C9)
- Elimination half-life: 11 h to 15 h
- Excretion: Kidney 20%, feces 65%

Identifiers
- IUPAC name: 2-butyl-3-({4-[2-(2H-1,2,3,4-tetrazol-5-yl)phenyl]phenyl}methyl)-1,3-diazaspiro[4.4]non-1-en-4-one
- CAS Number: 138402-11-6
- PubChem CID: 3749
- IUPHAR/BPS: 589
- DrugBank: DB01029
- ChemSpider: 3618
- UNII: J0E2756Z7N
- KEGG: D00523
- ChEBI: CHEBI:5959
- ChEMBL: ChEMBL1513
- CompTox Dashboard (EPA): DTXSID0023169
- ECHA InfoCard: 100.119.966

Chemical and physical data
- Formula: C_{25}H_{28}N_{6}O
- Molar mass: 428.540 g·mol^{−1}
- 3D model (JSmol): Interactive image
- SMILES: O=C1N(\C(=N/C12CCCC2)CCCC)Cc5ccc(c3ccccc3c4n[nH]nn4)cc5
- InChI: InChI=1S/C25H28N6O/c1-2-3-10-22-26-25(15-6-7-16-25)24(32)31(22)17-18-11-13-19(14-12-18)20-8-4-5-9-21(20)23-27-29-30-28-23/h4-5,8-9,11-14H,2-3,6-7,10,15-17H2,1H3,(H,27,28,29,30); Key:YOSHYTLCDANDAN-UHFFFAOYSA-N

Irbesartan, sold under the brand name Aprovel among others, is a medication used to treat hypertension (high blood pressure), heart failure, and diabetic kidney disease. It is a reasonable initial treatment for high blood pressure. It is taken by mouth. Versions are available as the combination irbesartan/hydrochlorothiazide.

== Medical uses ==
Irbesartan is used for the treatment of hypertension. It may also delay progression of diabetic nephropathy and is also indicated for the reduction of renal disease progression in patients with type 2 diabetes, hypertension and microalbuminuria (>30 mg/24 h) or proteinuria (>900 mg/24 h).

=== Combination with diuretic ===
Irbesartan is also available in a fixed-dose combination formulation with hydrochlorothiazide, a thiazide diuretic, to achieve an additive antihypertensive effect.

== Side effects ==
Common side effects include dizziness, diarrhea, feeling tired, muscle pain, and heartburn. Serious side effects may include kidney problems, low blood pressure, and angioedema. Use in pregnancy may harm the baby and use when breastfeeding is not recommended.

== Mechanism of action ==
Irbesartan is an angiotensin II receptor antagonist and works by blocking the effects of angiotensin II.

== History ==
Irbesartan was developed by Sanofi Research (part of Sanofi-Aventis). It is jointly marketed by Sanofi-Aventis and Bristol-Myers Squibb under the brand names Aprovel, Karvea, and Avapro.

It was patented in 1990, and approved for medical use in 1997. It is available as a generic medication. In 2023, it was the 134th most commonly prescribed medication in the United States, with more than 4 million prescriptions.

== Society and culture ==
=== Recalls ===
In 2018, the US Food and Drug Administration (FDA) reported that some versions of the angiotensin II receptor blocker medicines (including valsartan, losartan, irbesartan and other "-sartan" drugs) contained nitrosamine impurities. Health Canada also reported nitrosamine impurities.

The FDA issued revised guidelines about nitrosamine impurities in September 2024.
