= MTUS1 =

Mammalian protein found in Homo sapiens

Identifiers
- Aliases: MTUS1, ATBP, ATIP, ICIS, MP44, MTSG1, microtubule associated tumor suppressor 1, microtubule associated scaffold protein 1, ATIP3
- External IDs: OMIM: 609589; MGI: 2142572; HomoloGene: 100292; GeneCards: MTUS1; OMA:MTUS1 - orthologs

Gene location (Human)
Chr.	Chromosome 8 (human)
Band	8p22	Start	17,643,795 bp
Band	8p22	End	17,801,094 bp

Gene location (Mouse)
Chr.	Chromosome 8 (mouse)
Band	8|8 A4	Start	41,443,951 bp
Band	8|8 A4	End	41,586,763 bp
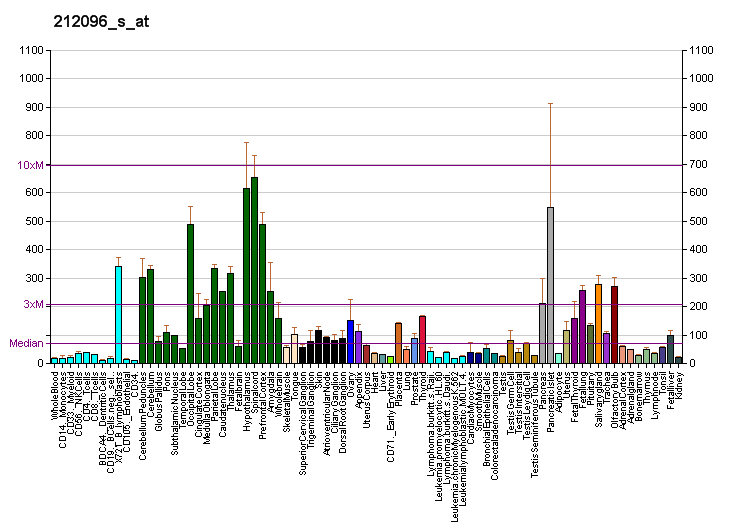

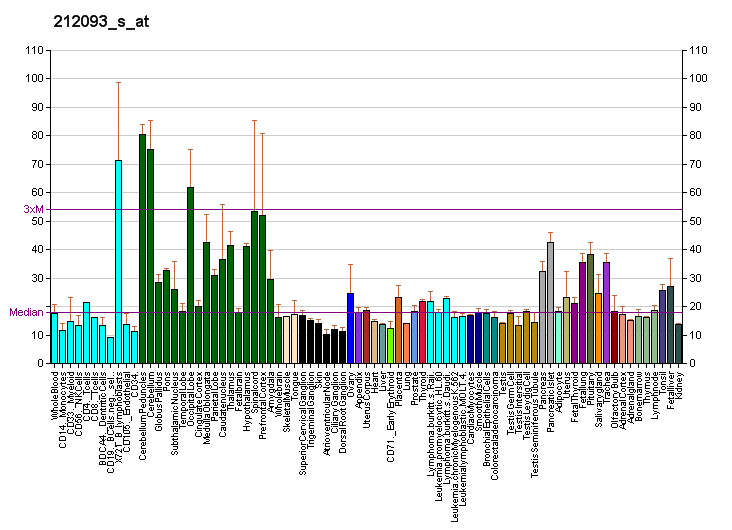

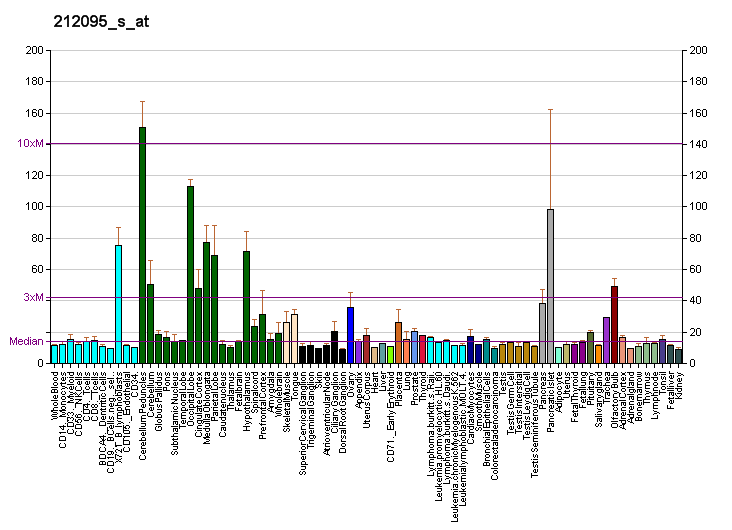
RNA expression pattern
Bgee	Human / Mouse (ortholog); Top expressed in: corpus callosum; inferior ganglion of vagus nerve; inferior olivary nucleus; body of pancreas; thoracic diaphragm; right ventricle; subthalamic nucleus; biceps brachii; C1 segment; Skeletal muscle tissue of biceps brachii / Top expressed in: zygote; secondary oocyte; primary oocyte; granulocyte; interventricular septum; lobe of cerebellum; cerebellar vermis; myocardium of ventricle; aortic valve; knee joint; More reference expression data
BioGPS	More reference expression data
Gene ontology
Molecular function	microtubule binding
Cellular component	cytoplasm; plasma membrane; Golgi apparatus; spindle; microtubule; cytoskeleton; membrane; mitochondrion; nucleus; microtubule organizing center; extracellular space; nucleolus; microtubule cytoskeleton
Biological process	regulation of macrophage chemotaxis
Sources:Amigo / QuickGO
Orthologs
Species	Human	Mouse
Entrez	57509	102103
Ensembl	ENSG00000129422	ENSMUSG00000045636
UniProt	Q9ULD2	Q5HZI1
RefSeq (mRNA)	NM_001001924; NM_001001925; NM_001001927; NM_001001931; NM_001166393 NM_020749; NM_001330470; NM_001363057; NM_001363058; NM_001363059; NM_001363060; NM_001363061; NM_001363062	NM_001005863; NM_001005864; NM_001005865; NM_001286413
RefSeq (protein)	NP_001001924; NP_001001925; NP_001001931; NP_001159865; NP_001317399 NP_065800; NP_001349986; NP_001349987; NP_001349988; NP_001349989; NP_001349990; NP_001349991	NP_001005863; NP_001005864; NP_001005865; NP_001273342; NP_001390875 NP_001390876; NP_001390879; NP_001390881; NP_001390883; NP_001390884; NP_001390885
Location (UCSC)	Chr 8: 17.64 – 17.8 Mb	Chr 8: 41.44 – 41.59 Mb
PubMed search
- Wikidata
View/Edit Human	View/Edit Mouse

Mitochondrial tumor suppressor 1 (MTSG1) or Microtubule-Associated Scaffold Protein 1 (MTUS1) is a candidate tumor suppressor protein encoded by the MTUS1 gene in humans. Expression levels of MTUS1 was reported to be lost in various types of human malignancies such as colon, ovarian, head-and-neck, pancreas, breast cancers, bladder, gastric, and lung cancers.

== Proteins encoded by MTUS1 ==
As a result of alternative splicing MTUS1 was shown to encode 5 different protein isoforms as listed as ATIP1, ATIP2, ATIP3a, ATIP3b and ATIP4. ATIP3a and ATIP3b was generally considered as ATIP3 and ATIP1 and ATIP3 is the major splice variants encoded by MTUS1 gene.

== Function ==
This gene encodes a protein which contains a C-terminal domain able to interact with the angiotensin II receptor type 2 (AT2) and a large coiled-coil region allowing dimerization. Multiple alternatively spliced transcript variants encoding different isoforms have been found for this gene. One of the transcript variants has been shown to encode a mitochondrial protein that acts as a tumor suppressor and participates in AT2 signaling pathways. Other variants may encode nuclear or transmembrane proteins but it has not been determined whether they also participate in AT2 signaling pathways.

== Interactions ==
MTUS1 has been shown to interact with Angiotensin II receptor type 2.
