= Candesartan =

Angiotensin II receptor antagonist

Candesartan cilexetil

Clinical data
- Pronunciation: /ˌkændɪˈsɑːrtənsɪˈlɛksɪtɪl/
- Trade names: Atacand, others
- AHFS/Drugs.com: Monograph
- MedlinePlus: a601033
- Pregnancy category: AU: D
- Routes of administration: By mouth
- ATC code: C09CA06 (WHO)

Legal status
- Legal status: In general: ℞ (Prescription only)

Pharmacokinetic data
- Bioavailability: 15% (candesartan cilexetil)
- Metabolism: Candesartan cilexetil: intestinal wall; candesartan: hepatic (CYP2C9)
- Elimination half-life: 9 hours
- Excretion: Kidney 33%, faecal 67%

Identifiers
- IUPAC name: 1-cyclohexyloxycarbonyloxyethyl 2-ethoxy-3-[[4-[2-(2''H''-tetrazol-5-yl)phenyl]phenyl]methyl]benzimidazole-4-carboxylate
- CAS Number: 145040-37-5
- PubChem CID: 2541
- IUPHAR/BPS: 8352
- DrugBank: DB00796
- ChemSpider: 2444
- UNII: R85M2X0D68
- KEGG: D00626
- ChEBI: CHEBI:3348
- ChEMBL: ChEMBL1014
- CompTox Dashboard (EPA): DTXSID0022725
- ECHA InfoCard: 100.132.654

Chemical and physical data
- Formula: C_{33}H_{34}N_{6}O_{6}
- Molar mass: 610.671 g·mol^{−1}
- 3D model (JSmol): Interactive image
- SMILES: CCOC1=NC2=CC=CC(=C2N1CC3=CC=C(C=C3)C4=CC=CC=C4C5=NNN=N5)C(=O)OC(C)OC(=O)OC6CCCCC6
- InChI: InChI=1S/C33H34N6O6/c1-3-42-32-34-28-15-9-14-27(31(40)43-21(2)44-33(41)45-24-10-5-4-6-11-24)29(28)39(32)20-22-16-18-23(19-17-22)25-12-7-8-13-26(25)30-35-37-38-36-30/h7-9,12-19,21,24H,3-6,10-11,20H2,1-2H3,(H,35,36,37,38); Key:GHOSNRCGJFBJIB-UHFFFAOYSA-N

Candesartan is an angiotensin receptor blocker (ARB) primarily used to treat high blood pressure and congestive heart failure. It is always administered in its inactive prodrug form, candesartan cilexetil, which is converted to the active drug during absorption in the gastrointestinal tract. Like olmesartan, candesartan is a cascading prodrug, a feature that influences its pharmacokinetics. It has good bioavailability and is considered one of the most potent AT_{1} receptor antagonists by weight. Its effective maintenance dose is also relatively low.

It was patented in 1990 and approved for medical use in 1997.

== Medical uses ==
=== Hypertension ===
As with other angiotensin II receptor antagonists, candesartan is indicated for the treatment of hypertension. Candesartan has an additive antihypertensive effect when combined with a diuretic, such as chlorthalidone. It is available in a fixed-combination formulation with a low dose of the thiazide diuretic hydrochlorothiazide (HCT). Candesartan/HCT combination preparations are marketed under various trade names including Atacand Plus, Hytacand, Blopress Plus, Advantec and Ratacand Plus.

=== Heart failure ===
In heart failure patients, angiotensin receptor blockers such as candesartan and valsartan may be a suitable option for those who do not tolerate angiotensin-converting enzyme inhibitor medicines. Randomised control trials have shown candesartan reduces heart failure hospitalisations and cardiovascular deaths for patients who have heart failure with reduced left ventricular ejection fraction (LVEF ~~≤~~ 40%).

=== Prehypertension ===
In a four-year randomized controlled trial, candesartan was compared to placebo to see whether it could prevent or postpone the development of full-blown hypertension in people with so-called prehypertension. During the first two years of the trial, half of participants were given candesartan while the other half received placebo; candesartan reduced the risk of developing hypertension by nearly two-thirds during this period. In the last two years of the study, all participants were switched to placebo. By the end of the study, candesartan had significantly reduced the risk of hypertension, by more than 15%. Serious adverse effects were more common among participants receiving placebo than in those given candesartan.

=== Prevention of atrial fibrillation ===
In 2005, meta-analysis results showed that angiotensin receptor blockers and angiotensin converting enzyme inhibitors considerably reduce the risk of atrial fibrillation in patients with coexisting heart failure and systolic left ventricular dysfunction. Specifically, an analysis of the CHARM study showed benefits for Candesartan in reducing new occurrences of atrial fibrillation in patients with heart failure and reduced left ventricular function. While these studies have demonstrated a potential additional benefit for candesartan when used in patients with systolic left ventricular dysfunction, additional studies are required to further elucidate the role of candesartan in the prevention of atrial fibrillation in other population groups.

=== Diabetic retinopathy ===
Use of antihypertensive drugs has been demonstrated to slow the progression of diabetic retinopathy; the role of candesartan specifically in reducing progression in type 1 and type 2 diabetes is still up for debate. Results from a 2008 study on patients with type 1 diabetes showed there was no benefit in using candesartan to reduce progression of diabetic retinopathy when compared to placebo. Candesartan has been demonstrated to reverse the severity (cause regression) of mild to moderate diabetic retinopathy in patients with type 2 diabetes. The patient populations investigated in these studies were limited to mostly Caucasians and those younger than 75 years of age, so generalization of these findings to other population groups should be done with caution.

=== Migraine prophylaxis ===
Candesartan may be helpful in migraine prevention as it has better tolerability and fewer side effects compared to other first line medications. It has been recommended by multiple guidelines for migraine prophylaxis in adults with different levels of recommendations, however further studies on larger populations are needed.

=== Depression and bipolar depression ===
Candesartan is currently being investigated as a potential adjunct therapy for both depression and bipolar depression in the CADET (Candesartan Adjunctive Trials) clinical trials. These studies—one for major depressive disorder and one for bipolar depression—are double-blind, placebo-controlled clinical trials. The proposed mechanism of action is via antagonism of the AT-1 receptor, which a 2017 meta-analysis indicated may have effects on mental health. As Candesartan is a strong AT-1 receptor antagonist, it was selected for the clinical trial.

== Adverse effects ==
As with other drugs that inhibit the renin–angiotensin system, if candesartan is taken by pregnant women during the second or third trimester, it can cause injury and in some cases, death of the developing fetus. Symptomatic hypotension may occur in people who take candesartan and are volume-depleted or salt-depleted, as can also occur when diuretics are coadministered. Reduction in renal glomerular filtration rate may occur; people with renal artery stenosis may be at higher risk. Hyperkalemia may occur; people who are also taking spironolactone or eplerenone may be at higher risk.

Anemia may occur, due to inhibition of the renin–angiotensin system.

As with other angiotensin receptor blockers, candesartan can rarely cause severe liver injury.

== Pharmacokinetics ==
Candesartan cilexetil metabolic activation

Candesartan is administered clinically as the cyclohexyl 1-hydroxy ethyl carbonate ester, known as candesartan cilexetil. It is a cascading prodrug that is completely metabolised by esterases in the intestinal wall during absorption, releasing the active candesartan moiety. In the first step of the activation process, the carbonate group is hydrolyzed, releasing carbon dioxide. This reaction also produces cyclohexanol, a relatively non-toxic byproduct that contributes to the favorable safety profile of the prodrug. Another side product of the cascading mechanism is acetic acid, derived from the hydrolysis of the O-CH(CH_{3})- group; like cyclohexanol, it is also non-toxic and poses minimal risk during drug activation.

The use of the prodrug form, candesartan cilexetil, enhances the bioavailability of candesartan. However, its absolute bioavailability remains relatively low, ranging from approximately 15% when administered as tablets to 40% as an oral solution. Candesartan has an IC_{50} of 15 μg/kg. The active form of candesartan is not used directly in clinical practice, as it would require higher dosing and is associated with a less favorable adverse event profile.

== Research ==
There is ongoing research into several potential benefits of candesartan beyond established indications. Candesartan is being investigated for its neuroprotective and anti-inflammatory properties. In an early Alzheimer's disease mouse model, candesartan significantly reduced amyloid burden and inflammation and it is being examined as a potential treatment for early Alzheimer's. Rat models indicate that candesartan may have neuroprotective benefits that mitigate certain central mechanisms of ageing and senescence. Additionally, candesartan has shown potential therapeutic applications as an anti-anxiety agent. In a double-blind, placebo-controlled, randomized study, candesartan induced regression of left ventricular hypertrophy, and improved both LV function and exercise tolerance with no side effects in patients with non-obstructive hypertrophic cardiomyopathy. The unique anti-oxidative and anti-inflammatory effects of Candesartan are shown to offer superior renoprotection of chronic renal inflammation, and in ultrahigh doses and in a multidrug context, could be investigated as potentially inducing remission of chronic kidney disease.

== History ==
The compound known as TCV-116 (candesartan) was studied by Japanese scientists using standard laboratory rats. Animal studies were published showing the effectiveness of the compound in 1992–1993, with a pilot study on humans published in the summer of 1993.

== Names ==
The prodrug candesartan cilexetil is marketed by AstraZeneca and Takeda Pharmaceuticals, commonly under the trade names Blopress, Atacand, Amias, and Ratacand. It is available in generic form.
