= Angiotensin II receptor =

Class of G protein-coupled receptors

angiotensin II receptor, type 1

Identifiers
- Symbol: AGTR1
- Alt. symbols: AGTR1B
- IUPHAR: 34
- NCBI gene: 185
- HGNC: 336
- OMIM: 106165
- RefSeq: NM_000685
- UniProt: P30556

Other data
- Locus: Chr. 3 q21-q25
Search for
- Structures: Swiss-model
- Domains: InterPro

angiotensin II receptor, type 2

Identifiers
- Symbol: AGTR2
- IUPHAR: 35
- NCBI gene: 186
- HGNC: 338
- OMIM: 300034
- RefSeq: NM_000686
- UniProt: P50052

Other data
- Locus: Chr. X q22-q23
Search for
- Structures: Swiss-model
- Domains: InterPro

The angiotensin II receptors, (ATR1) and (ATR2), are a class of G protein-coupled receptors with angiotensin II as their ligands. They are important in the renin–angiotensin system: they are responsible for the signal transduction of the vasoconstricting stimulus of the main effector hormone, angiotensin II.

== Structure ==
The AT_{1} and AT_{2} receptors share a sequence identity of ~30%, but have a similar affinity for angiotensin II, which is their main ligand.

== Members ==
=== Overview table ===
Receptor	Mechanism
AT_{1}	G_{q/11}; G_{i/o}
AT_{2}	G_{i2} / _{3}
AT_{3}	
AT_{4}	

=== AT_{1} ===
The AT_{1} receptor is the best characterized angiotensin receptor.

==== Location within the body ====
The AT1 subtype is found in the heart, blood vessels, kidney, adrenal cortex, lung and circumventricular organs of brain, basal ganglia, brainstem and mediates the vasoconstrictor effects.

==== Mechanism ====
The angiotensin receptor is activated by the vasoconstricting peptide angiotensin II. The activated receptor in turn couples to G_{q/11} and G_{i/o} and thus activates phospholipase C and increases the cytosolic Ca^{2+} concentrations, which in turn triggers cellular responses such as stimulation of protein kinase C. Activated receptor also inhibits adenylate cyclase and activates various tyrosine kinases.

==== Effects ====
Effects mediated by the AT_{1} receptor include vasoconstriction, aldosterone synthesis and secretion, increased vasopressin secretion, cardiac hypertrophy, augmentation of peripheral noradrenergic activity, vascular smooth muscle cells proliferation, decreased renal blood flow, renal renin inhibition, renal tubular sodium reuptake, modulation of central sympathetic nervous system activity, cardiac contractility, central osmocontrol and extracellular matrix formation.

=== AT_{2} ===
AT_{2} receptors are more plentiful in the fetus and neonate. The AT_{2} receptor remains enigmatic and controversial – is probably involved in vascular growth. Effects mediated by the AT_{2} receptor are suggested to include inhibition of cell growth, fetal tissue development, modulation of extracellular matrix, neuronal regeneration, apoptosis, cellular differentiation, and maybe vasodilation and left ventricular hypertrophy. In humans the AT2 subtype is found in molecular layer of the cerebellum. In the mouse is found in the adrenal gland, amygdaloid nuclei and, in small numbers, in the paraventricular nucleus of the hypothalamus and the locus coeruleus.

=== AT_{3} and AT_{4} ===
Other poorly characterized subtypes include the AT_{3} and AT_{4} receptors. The AT_{4} receptor is activated by the angiotensin II metabolite angiotensin IV, and may play a role in regulation of the CNS extracellular matrix, as well as modulation of oxytocin release.

== See also ==
- Angiotensin II receptor antagonist
