= Angiotensin II receptor type 2 =

Protein-coding gene in humans

AGTR2

Identifiers
- Aliases: AGTR2, AT2, ATGR2, MRX88, Angiotensin II receptor type 2
- External IDs: OMIM: 300034; MGI: 87966; GeneCards: AGTR2

Gene location (Human)
Chr.	X chromosome (human)
Band	Xq23	Start	116,170,744 bp
Band	Xq23	End	116,174,974 bp

Gene location (Mouse)
Chr.	X chromosome (mouse)
Band	X A2|X 16.71 cM	Start	21,350,783 bp
Band	X A2|X 16.71 cM	End	21,355,403 bp
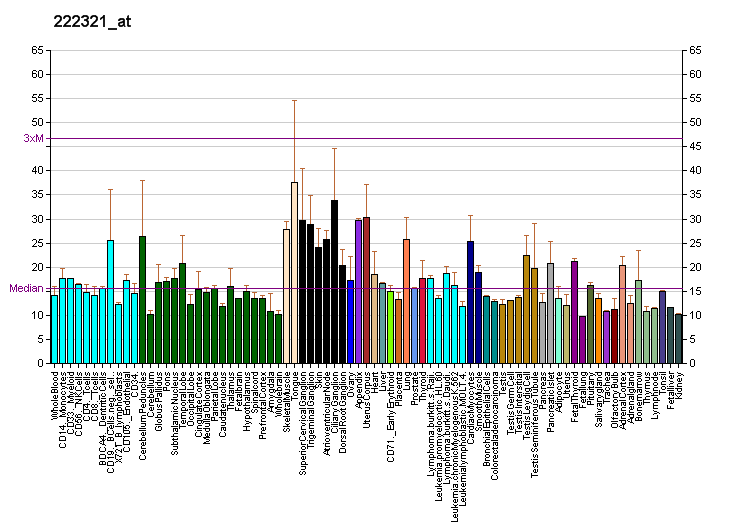

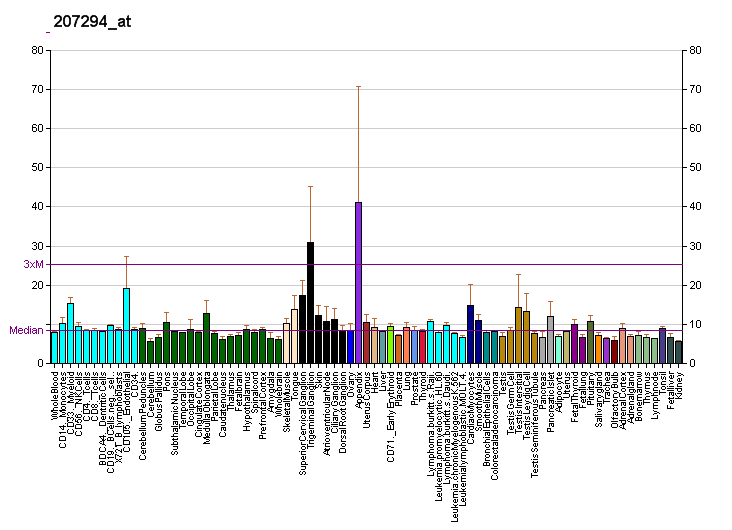

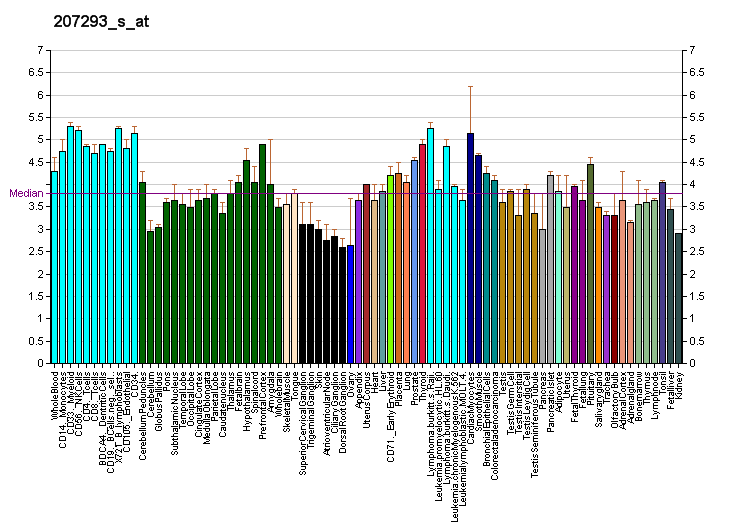
RNA expression pattern
Bgee	Human / Mouse (ortholog); Top expressed in: smooth muscle tissue; tibia; lower lobe of lung; cartilage tissue; left uterine tube; visceral pleura; right lung; upper lobe of lung; upper lobe of left lung; superficial temporal artery / Top expressed in: dermis; efferent ductule; vas deferens; human fetus; superior cervical ganglion; internal carotid artery; Gonadal ridge; external carotid artery; umbilical cord; corneal stroma; More reference expression data
BioGPS	More reference expression data
Gene ontology
Molecular function	signal transducer activity; receptor antagonist activity; peptide hormone binding; G protein-coupled receptor activity; protein binding; angiotensin type II receptor activity; transcription factor binding
Cellular component	integral component of membrane; membrane; perinuclear region of cytoplasm; plasma membrane; integral component of plasma membrane; extracellular region
Biological process	regulation of metanephros size; positive regulation of metanephric glomerulus development; intracellular signal transduction; kidney morphogenesis; regulation of apoptotic process; positive regulation of branching involved in ureteric bud morphogenesis; positive regulation of nitric-oxide synthase activity; signal transduction; dopamine biosynthetic process; positive regulation of nitric oxide biosynthetic process; negative regulation of norepinephrine secretion; cellular sodium ion homeostasis; renin-angiotensin regulation of aldosterone production; cellular response to dexamethasone stimulus; brain development; angiotensin-mediated vasodilation involved in regulation of systemic arterial blood pressure; brain renin-angiotensin system; regulation of blood pressure; kidney development; negative regulation of icosanoid secretion; positive regulation of extrinsic apoptotic signaling pathway; regulation of systemic arterial blood pressure by circulatory renin-angiotensin; aldosterone secretion; G protein-coupled receptor signaling pathway coupled to cGMP nucleotide second messenger; positive regulation of cell population proliferation; positive regulation of transcription, DNA-templated; negative regulation of blood vessel endothelial cell migration; negative regulation of neurotrophin TRK receptor signaling pathway; response to organonitrogen compound; cerebellar cortex development; negative regulation of fibroblast proliferation; blood vessel remodeling; cell growth involved in cardiac muscle cell development; negative regulation of heart rate; negative regulation of cell growth; positive regulation of phosphoprotein phosphatase activity; exploration behavior; inflammatory response; positive regulation of renal sodium excretion; cell surface receptor signaling pathway; nitric oxide mediated signal transduction; angiotensin-activated signaling pathway; extracellular negative regulation of signal transduction; vasodilation; blood vessel diameter maintenance; G protein-coupled receptor signaling pathway; regulation of protein import into nucleus; negative regulation of signaling receptor activity
Sources:Amigo / QuickGO
Orthologs
Databases	NCBI: entry; OMA: entry
Species	Human	Mouse
Entrez	186	11609
Ensembl	ENSG00000180772	ENSMUSG00000068122
UniProt	P50052	P35374
RefSeq (mRNA)	NM_000686; NM_001385624	NM_007429
RefSeq (protein)	NP_000677	NP_031455
Location (UCSC)	Chr X: 116.17 – 116.17 Mb	Chr X: 21.35 – 21.36 Mb
PubMed search
- Wikidata
View/Edit Human	View/Edit Mouse

Angiotensin II receptor type 2, also known as the AT_{2} receptor, is a protein that in humans is encoded by the AGTR2 gene.

== Function ==
Angiotensin II is a potent pressor hormone and a primary regulator of aldosterone secretion. It is an important effector controlling blood pressure and volume in the cardiovascular system. It acts through at least two types of receptors termed AT_{1} and AT_{2}. AGTR2 belongs to a family 1 of G protein-coupled receptors. It is an integral membrane protein. It plays a role in the central nervous system and cardiovascular functions that are mediated by the renin–angiotensin system. This receptor mediates programmed cell death (apoptosis). Consistent with its apoptotic function, angiotensin II receptor type II also opposes cell proliferation, as demonstrated by its antagonism of MAPK activity in cardiac fibroblasts during interstitial fibrosis. In adults, it is highly expressed in myometrium with lower levels in adrenal gland and fallopian tube. It is highly expressed in fetal kidney and intestine. The human AGTR2 gene is composed of three exons and spans at least 5 kb. Exons 1 and 2 encode for 5' untranslated mRNA sequence and exon 3 harbors the entire uninterrupted open reading frame.

Stimulation of AT_{2} by the selective agonist CGP 42112A increases mucosal nitric oxide production.

== Gene ==
Angiotensin II receptor type 2 (AGTR2) gene is a protein coding gene responsible for encoding AGTR2, the integral membrane protein that binds to two different G-protein coupled receptors. AGTR2 has recently been discovered to play a role in modifying lung disease. This receptor functions to mediate signaling in lung fibrosis and regulate nitric oxide synthase expression in pulmonary endothelium. AGTR2 has recently been prescribed as a target for lung inflammation therapy in cases of cystic fibrosis (CF). The X-chromosome region associated with CF lung disease is located in a non-coding region 3′ of the AGTR2 gene. The modification effect is likely due to variation in gene regulation rather than a change in protein coding sequence.

Variants at the X-chromosome locus containing AGTR2 gene were identified as significantly associating with lung function in patients with cystic fibrosis. Genetically modified mouse studies determined that absence of the AGTR2 gene normalized pulmonary function indicators in two independent CF mouse models. Furthermore, pharmacological antagonism of AGTR2 signaling improved lung function in CF mice to near wild-type levels. Manipulation of the angiotensin-signaling pathway to reduce AGTR2 signaling may be translatable for the treatment or prevention of CF.

== Interactions ==
Angiotensin II receptor type 2 has been shown to interact with MTUS1.

== See also ==
- Angiotensin II receptor
