= Eprosartan =

Angiotensin II receptor antagonist

Clinical data
- Trade names: Teveten
- AHFS/Drugs.com: Monograph
- MedlinePlus: a601237
- License data: US DailyMed: Eprosartan
- Pregnancy category: AU: D
- Routes of administration: By mouth
- ATC code: C09CA02 (WHO)

Legal status
- Legal status: AU: S4 (Prescription only); US: ℞-only

Pharmacokinetic data
- Bioavailability: 15% (Eprosartan mesylate)
- Metabolism: not metabolized
- Elimination half-life: 5 to 9 hours
- Excretion: Kidney 10%, bile duct 90%

Identifiers
- IUPAC name: 4-({2-Butyl-5-[2-carboxy-2-(thiophen-2-ylmethyl)eth-1-en-1-yl]-1H-imidazol-1-yl}methyl)benzoic acid
- CAS Number: 133040-01-4
- PubChem CID: 5281037
- IUPHAR/BPS: 588
- DrugBank: DB00876
- ChemSpider: 4444504
- UNII: 2KH13Z0S0Y
- KEGG: D04040; as mesylate: D02082
- ChEBI: CHEBI:4814
- ChEMBL: ChEMBL813
- CompTox Dashboard (EPA): DTXSID0022989

Chemical and physical data
- Formula: C_{23}H_{24}N_{2}O_{4}S
- Molar mass: 424.52 g·mol^{−1}
- 3D model (JSmol): Interactive image
- SMILES: O=C(O)\C(=C\c1cnc(n1Cc2ccc(C(=O)O)cc2)CCCC)Cc3sccc3
- InChI: InChI=1S/C23H24N2O4S/c1-2-3-6-21-24-14-19(12-18(23(28)29)13-20-5-4-11-30-20)25(21)15-16-7-9-17(10-8-16)22(26)27/h4-5,7-12,14H,2-3,6,13,15H2,1H3,(H,26,27)(H,28,29)/b18-12+; Key:OROAFUQRIXKEMV-LDADJPATSA-N

Eprosartan, sold under the brand name Teveten among others, is an angiotensin II receptor antagonist used for the treatment of high blood pressure.

Eprosartan is sometimes paired with hydrochlorothiazide.

As with other angiotensin II receptor antagonists, eprosartan is generally better tolerated than enalapril (an ACE inhibitor), especially among the elderly.

== History ==
The compound came into the Abbott Laboratories cardiovascular pipeline with its acquisition of Kos Pharmaceuticals in 2006, which had licensed it, along with "a range of hypertensive treatments", from the Biovail Corporation.
