= Angiotensin II receptor blocker =

Group of pharmaceuticals that modulate the renin–angiotensin system

Losartan, the first ARB

Angiotensin II receptor blockers (ARBs), formally angiotensin II receptor type 1 (AT_{1}) antagonists, also known as angiotensin receptor blockers, angiotensin II receptor antagonists, or AT_{1} receptor antagonists, are a group of pharmaceuticals that bind to and inhibit the angiotensin II receptor type 1 (AT_{1}) and thereby block the arteriolar contraction and sodium retention effects of renin–angiotensin system.

Their main uses are in the treatment of hypertension (high blood pressure), diabetic nephropathy (kidney damage due to diabetes) and congestive heart failure. They selectively block the activation of the AT_{1} receptor, preventing the binding of angiotensin II compared to ACE inhibitors.

ARBs and the similar-attributed ACE inhibitors are both indicated as the first-line antihypertensives in patients developing hypertension along with left-sided heart failure. However, ARBs appear to produce fewer adverse effects compared to ACE inhibitors.

== Medical uses ==
Angiotensin II receptor blockers are used primarily for the treatment of hypertension where the patient is intolerant of ACE inhibitor therapy primarily because of persistent and/or dry cough. They do not inhibit the breakdown of bradykinin or other kinins, and are thus only rarely associated with the persistent dry cough and/or angioedema that limit ACE inhibitor therapy. More recently, they have been used for the treatment of heart failure in patients intolerant of ACE inhibitor therapy, in particular candesartan. Irbesartan and losartan have trial data showing benefit in hypertensive patients with type 2 diabetes, and may delay the progression of diabetic nephropathy. A 1998 double-blind study found "that lisinopril improved insulin sensitivity whereas losartan did not affect it." Candesartan is used experimentally in preventive treatment of migraine. Lisinopril has been found less often effective than candesartan at preventing migraine.

The angiotensin II receptor blockers have differing potencies in relation to blood pressure control, with statistically differing effects at the maximal doses. When used in clinical practice, the particular agent used may vary based on the degree of response required.

Some of these drugs have a uricosuric effect.

Angiotensin II, through AT_{1} receptor stimulation, is a major stress hormone and, because (ARBs) block these receptors, in addition to their eliciting anti-hypertensive effects, may be considered for the treatment of stress-related disorders.

In 2008, they were reported to have a remarkable negative association with Alzheimer's disease (AD). A retrospective analysis of five million patient records with the US Department of Veterans Affairs system found different types of commonly used antihypertensive medications had very different AD outcomes. Those patients taking angiotensin receptor blockers (ARBs) were 35 to 40% less likely to develop AD than those using other antihypertensives.

A retrospective study of 1,968 stroke patients revealed that prestroke treatment with ARB may be associated with both reduced stroke severity and better outcome. This finding agrees with experimental data that suggest that ARB's exert a cerebral protective effect.

== Adverse effects ==
This class of drugs is usually well tolerated. Common adverse drug reactions (ADRs) include: dizziness, headache, and/or hyperkalemia. Infrequent ADRs associated with therapy include: first dose orthostatic hypotension, rash, diarrhea, dyspepsia, abnormal liver function, muscle cramp, myalgia, back pain, insomnia, decreased hemoglobin levels, renal impairment, pharyngitis, and/or nasal congestion. A 2014 Cochrane systematic review based on randomized controlled trials reported that when comparing patients taking ACE inhibitors to patients taking ARBs, fewer ARB patients withdrew from the study due to adverse events compared to ACE inhibitor patients.

While one of the main rationales for the use of this class is the avoidance of a persistent dry cough and/or angioedema associated with ACE inhibitor therapy, rarely they may still occur. In addition, there is also a small risk of cross-reactivity in patients having experienced angioedema with ACE inhibitor therapy.

=== Myocardial infarction ===
The issue of whether angiotensin II receptor antagonists slightly increase the risk of myocardial infarction (MI or heart attack) is currently being investigated. Some studies suggest ARBs can increase the risk of MI. However, other studies have found ARBs do not increase the risk of MI. To date, with no consensus on whether ARBs have a tendency to increase the risk of myocardial infarction, further investigations are underway.

Indeed, as a consequence of AT_{1} blockade, ARBs increase angiotensin II levels several-fold above baseline by uncoupling a negative-feedback loop. Increased levels of circulating angiotensin II result in unopposed stimulation of the AT_{2} receptors, which are, in addition, upregulated. However, recent data suggest AT_{2} receptor stimulation may be less beneficial than previously proposed, and may even be harmful under certain circumstances through mediation of growth promotion, fibrosis, and hypertrophy, as well as eliciting proatherogenic and proinflammatory effects.

=== Cancer ===
A study published in 2010 determined that "...meta-analysis of randomised controlled trials suggests that ARBs are associated with a modestly increased risk of new cancer diagnosis. Given the limited data, it is not possible to draw conclusions about the exact risk of cancer associated with each particular drug. These findings warrant further investigation." A later meta-analysis by the U.S. Food and Drug Administration (FDA) of 31 randomized controlled trials comparing ARBs to other treatment found no evidence of an increased risk of incident (new) cancer, cancer-related death, breast cancer, lung cancer, or prostate cancer in patients receiving ARBs. In 2013, comparative effectiveness research from the United States Department of Veterans Affairs on the experience of more than a million veterans found no increased risks for either lung cancer or prostate cancer. The researchers concluded: "In this large nationwide cohort of United States Veterans, we found no evidence to support any concern of increased risk of lung cancer among new users of ARBs compared with nonusers. Our findings were consistent with a protective effect of ARBs."

In May 2013, a senior regulator at the Food & Drug Administration, Medical Team Leader Thomas A. Marciniak, revealed publicly that contrary to the FDA's official conclusion that there was no increased cancer risk, after a patient-by-patient examination of the available FDA data he had concluded that there was a lung-cancer risk increase of about 24% in ARB patients, compared with patients taking a placebo or other drugs. One of the criticisms Marciniak made was that the earlier FDA meta-analysis did not count lung carcinomas as cancers. In ten of the eleven studies he examined, Marciniak said that there were more lung cancer cases in the ARB group than the control group. Ellis Unger, chief of the drug-evaluation division that includes Marciniak, was quoted as calling the complaints a "diversion," and saying in an interview, "We have no reason to tell the public anything new." In an article about the dispute, the Wall Street Journal interviewed three other doctors to get their views; one had "no doubt" ARBs increased cancer risk, one was concerned and wanted to see more data, and the third thought there was either no relationship or a hard to detect, low-frequency relationship.

A 2016 meta-analysis including 148,334 patients found no significant differences in cancer incidence associated with ARB use.

=== Kidney failure ===
Although ARBs have protective effects against developing kidney diseases for patients with diabetes and previous hypertension without administration of ARBs, ARBs may worsen kidney functions such as reducing glomerular filtration rate associated with a rise of serum creatinine in patients with pre-existing proteinuria, renal artery stenosis, hypertensive nephrosclerosis, heart failure, polycystic kidney disease, chronic kidney disease, interstitial fibrosis, focal segmental glomerulosclerosis, or any conditions such as ARBs-treated but still clinically present hypertension that lead to abnormal narrowing of blood vessels to the kidney that interrupts oxygen and nutrient supply to the organ.

== Structure ==
Losartan, irbesartan, olmesartan, candesartan, valsartan, fimasartan include the tetrazole group (a ring with four nitrogen and one carbon). Losartan, irbesartan, olmesartan, candesartan, and telmisartan include one or two imidazole groups.

== Mechanism of action ==
These substances are AT_{1}-receptor antagonists; that is, they block the activation of angiotensin II AT_{1} receptors. AT_{1} receptors are found in smooth muscle cells of vessels, cortical cells of the adrenal gland, and adrenergic nerve synapses. Blockage of AT_{1} receptors directly causes vasodilation, reduces secretion of vasopressin, and reduces production and secretion of aldosterone, among other actions. The combined effect reduces blood pressure.

The specific efficacy of each ARB within this class depends upon a combination of three pharmacodynamic (PD) and pharmacokinetic (PK) parameters. Efficacy requires three key PD/PK areas at an effective level; the parameters of the three characteristics will need to be compiled into a table similar to one below, eliminating duplications and arriving at consensus values; the latter are at variance now.

=== Pressor inhibition ===
Pressor inhibition at trough level — this relates to the degree of blockade or inhibition of the blood pressure-raising ("pressor") effect of angiotensin II. However, pressor inhibition is not a measure of blood pressure-lowering (BP) efficacy per se. The rates as listed in the U.S. Food and Drug Administration (FDA) Package Inserts (PIs) for inhibition of this effect at the 24th hour for the ARBs are as follows:

- Valsartan – 30% at 80 mg
- Telmisartan – 40% at 80 mg
- Losartan – 25–40% at 100 mg
- Irbesartan – 40% at 150 mg; 60% 300 mg
- Azilsartan – 60% at 32 mg
- Olmesartan – 61% at 20 mg; 74% at 40 mg

=== AT_{1} affinity vs AT_{2} ===
The ratios of AT_{1} to AT_{2} in binding affinities of the specific ARBs are shown as follows. However, AT_{1} affinity vs AT_{2} is not a meaningful indicator of blood pressure response.

- Losartan – 1000-fold
- Telmisartan – 3000-fold
- Irbesartan – 8500-fold
- Candesartan – greater than 10000-fold
- Olmesartan – 12500-fold
- Valsartan – 30000-fold
- Saprisartan – ???

=== Component ===
Nearly all ARBs contain biphenyltetrazole moiety except telmisartan and eprosartan.

=== Active agent ===
Losartan carries a heterocycle imidazole while valsartan carries a nonplanar acylated amino acid.

== Inhibition of Angiotensin II Type 1 Receptor ==
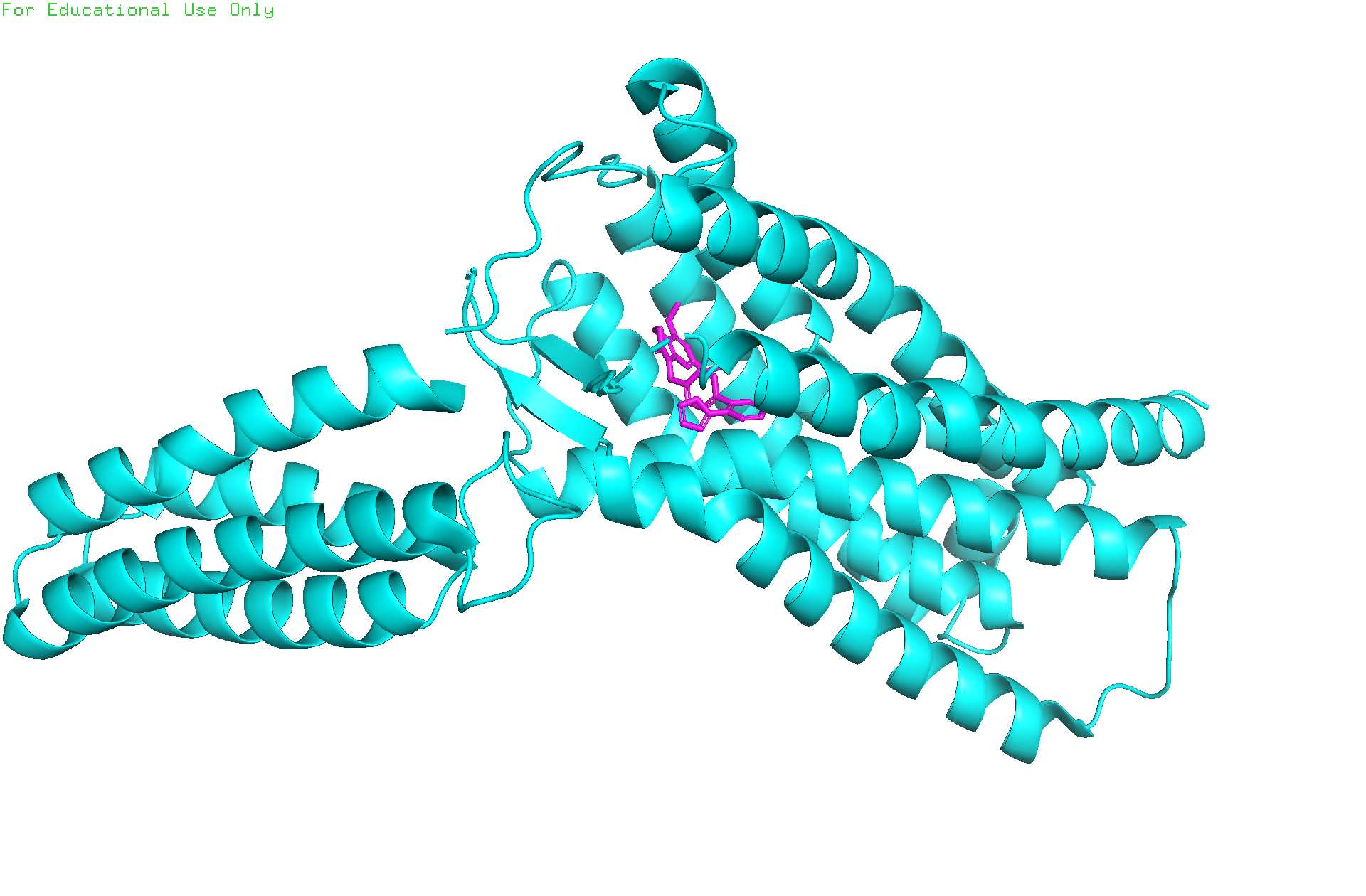
Structure of AT_{1}R with ZD7155 in the active site. PDB: 4YAY

In one report, to determine the structure and binding mode of AT_{1}R blockers a small molecule antagonist (ZD7155) was used. This antihypertensive compound is a precursor to the drug candesartan, and as such, possess a biphenyl-tetrazole moiety similar to other AT_{1}R blockers. ZD7155 was shown to make several key interactions within the active site, revealing the binding mode of AT_{1}R blockers.

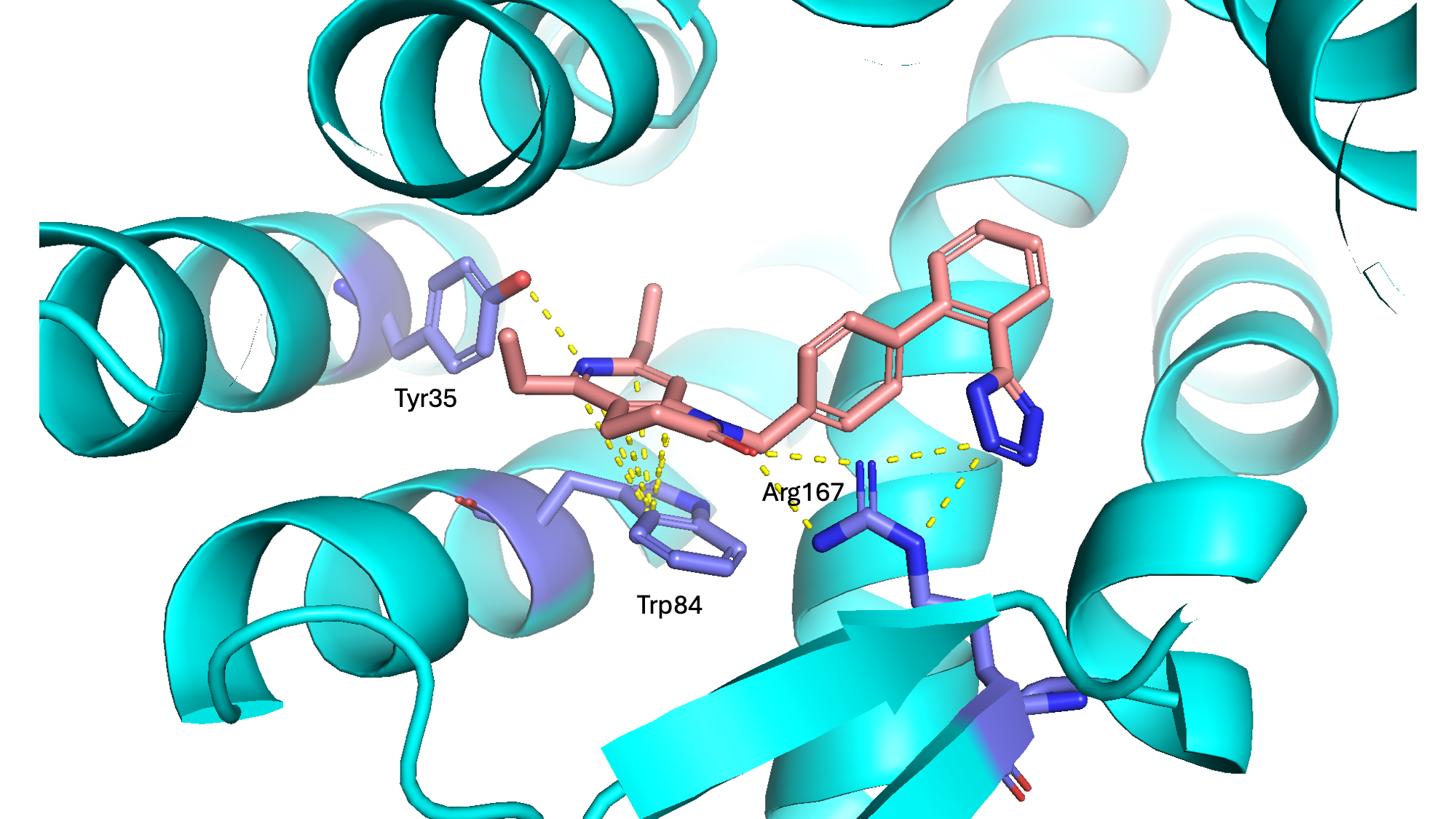
Active site of AT_{1}R depicting key interactions with ZD7155. PDB: 4YAY

Through X-Ray Crystallography, one studied showed that there are three key side chains involved in the inhibition of AT_{1}R. Arg167, Trp84, and Tyr35 were shown to interact with AT_{1}R blocker compounds through ionic bonding, hydrogen bonding, and π-π interactions within the active site of AT_{1}R. Then through competitive inhibition these antihypertensive compounds render the AT_{1}R inactive and therefore produce the intended therapeutic effects.

== Pharmacokinetics comparison ==
Table 1: Comparison of ARB pharmacokinetics
Drug	Trade name	Biological half-life [hrs]	Peak plasma concentration [Tmax]	Protein binding [%]	Bioavailability [%]	Renal/hepatic clearance [%]	Food effect	Daily dosage [mg]	Metabolism/transporter
Losartan	Cozaar	2 h	1 hr	98.7%	33%	10/90%	Minimal	50–100	Sensitive substrates: CYP2C9 and CYP3A4
EXP 3174 active metabolite of losartan	-	6–9 hrs	3–4 hrs after oral losartan administration	99.8%	–	50/50%	–	–	AUC reduced by phenytoin and rifampin by 63% and 40% respectively; specific CYP450 isozymes are unknown
Candesartan	Atacand	9	3–4 hrs	>99%	15%	60/40%	No	4–32	Moderate sensitive substrate: CYP2C9
Valsartan	Diovan	6	2–4 hrs	95%	25%	30/70%	Yes	80–320	Substrates: MRP2 and OATP1B1/SLCO1B1
Irbesartan	Avapro	11–15	1.5–2 hrs	90–95%	70%	20/80%	No	150–300	Minor substrates of CYP2C9
Telmisartan	Micardis	24	0.5–1 hr	>99%	42–58%	1/99%	No	40–80	None known; >97% via biliary excretion
Eprosartan	Teveten	5	1–2 hrs	98%	13%	30/70%	No	400–800	None known; >90% via renal and biliary excretion
Olmesartan	Benicar/Olmetec	14–16	1–2 hrs	>99%	29%	40/60%	No	10–40	Substrates of OATP1B1/SLCO1B1
Azilsartan	Edarbi	11	1.5–3 hrs	>99%	60%	55/42%	No	40–80	Minor substrates of CYP2C9
Fimasartan	Kanarb	7–11	0.5–3 hrs after dosing.	>97%	30–40%	–	–	30–120	None known; primarily biliary excretion

== Research ==
=== Longevity ===
Knockout of the Agtr1a gene that encodes AT_{1} results in marked prolongation of the life-span of mice, by 26% compared to controls. The likely mechanism is reduction of oxidative damage (especially to mitochondria) and overexpression of renal prosurvival genes. The ARBs seem to have the same effect.

=== Fibrosis regression ===
ARBs, such as losartan, have been shown to curb or reduce muscular, liver, cardiac, and kidney fibrosis.

=== Dilated aortic root regression ===
A 2003 study using candesartan and valsartan demonstrated an ability to regress dilated aortic root size.

== Impurities ==
=== Nitrosamines ===
In June 2018, the US Food and Drug Administration (FDA) found traces of NDMA and NDEA impurities in the angiotensin II receptor blocker (ARB) drug products valsartan, losartan, and irbesartan. The FDA stated "In June 2018, FDA was informed of the presence of an impurity, identified as N-Nitrosodimethylamine (NDMA), from one API producer. Since then, FDA has determined that other types of nitrosamine compounds, e.g., N-Nitrosodiethylamine (NDEA), are present at unacceptable levels in APIs from multiple API producers of valsartan and other drugs in the ARB class." In 2018, the FDA issued guidance to the industry on how to assess and control the impurities.

In August 2020, the European Medicines Agency (EMA) provided guidance to marketing authorization holders on how to avoid the presence of nitrosamine impurities in human medicines and asked them to review all chemical and biological human medicines for the possible presence of nitrosamines and to test the products at risk.

In November 2020, the Committee for Medicinal Products for Human Use (CHMP) of the EMA aligned recommendations for limiting nitrosamine impurities in sartan medicines with recommendations it issued for other classes of medicines. The main change concerns the limits for nitrosamines, which previously applied to the active ingredients but now apply instead to the finished products (e.g. tablets). These limits, based on internationally agreed standards (ICH M7(R1)), should ensure that the excess risk of cancer from nitrosamines in any sartan medicines is below 1 in 100,000 for a person taking the medicine for lifelong treatment.

These sartan medicines have a specific ring structure (tetrazole) whose synthesis could potentially lead to the formation of nitrosamine impurities. Other sartan medicines which do not have this ring, such as azilsartan, eprosartan and telmisartan, were not included in this review but are covered by the subsequent review of other medicines.

The FDA issued revised guidelines about nitrosamine impurities in September 2024.

=== Azides ===
Losartan azide (left) and AZBT (right), two azido process impurities detected in sartans. Losartan azide occurs exclusively during manufacture of losartan, while AZBT can be found in several drugs in the class.

In April 2021, the European Directorate for the Quality of Medicines (EDQM) warned of the risk of contamination with non-nitrosamine impurities (specifically, azido compounds) in tetrazole-containing sartans. In September 2021, the EDQM announced that investigations had revealed a novel azido contaminant which occurs only in losartan (losartan azide or losartan azido impurity) and which was found to be mutagenic on Ames testing.

Later in 2021 and 2022, several cases of contamination with azido impurities were detected in losartan, irbesartan, and valsartan, prompting regulatory responses ranging from investigation to market withdrawals and precautionary recalls in Australia, Brazil, and Europe (including Switzerland).

Teva Pharmaceuticals announced that it would change its losartan manufacturing process to prevent future contamination with these impurities, and the Indian API manufacturer IOL Chemicals and Pharmaceuticals applied for a patent on a new synthesis of losartan designed to be free of azido contaminants.
