= Angiotensin II receptor type 1 =

Protein found in humans

AGTR1
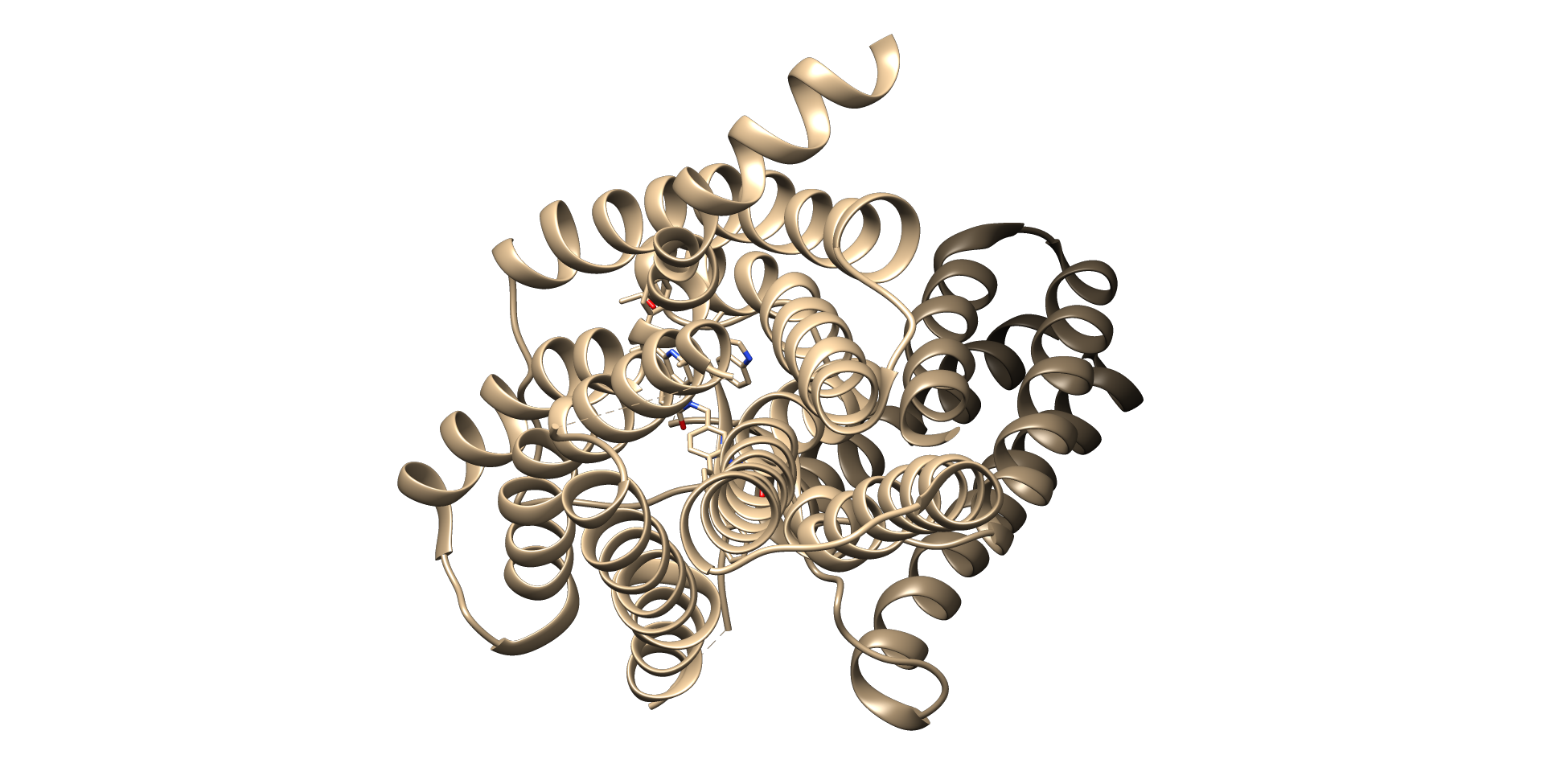

Identifiers
- Aliases: AGTR1, AG2S, AGTR1B, AT1, AT1AR, AT1B, AT1BR, AT1R, AT2R1, HAT1R, angiotensin II receptor type 1
- External IDs: OMIM: 106165; MGI: 87964; GeneCards: AGTR1
Available structures
PDB	Ortholog search: PDBe RCSB
PDB	List of PDB id codes 4YAY, 4ZUD

Gene location (Human)
Chr.	Chromosome 3 (human)
Band	3q24	Start	148,697,784 bp
Band	3q24	End	148,743,008 bp

Gene location (Mouse)
Chr.	Chromosome 13 (mouse)
Band	13 A3.2|13 13.19 cM	Start	30,520,424 bp
Band	13 A3.2|13 13.19 cM	End	30,566,850 bp
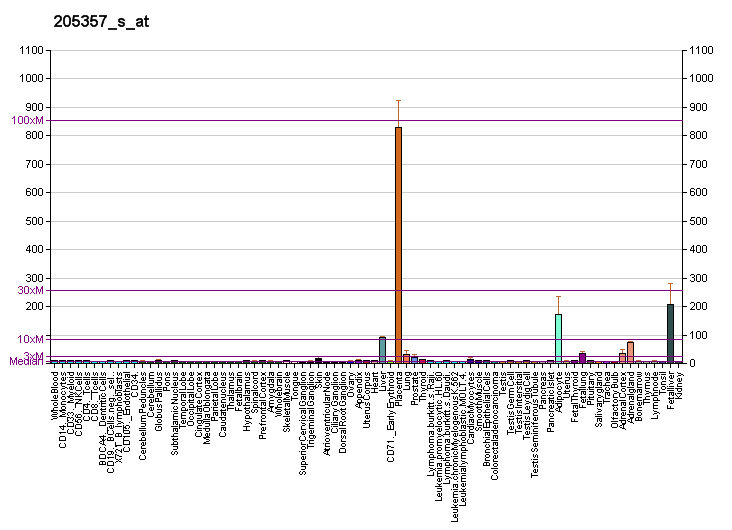

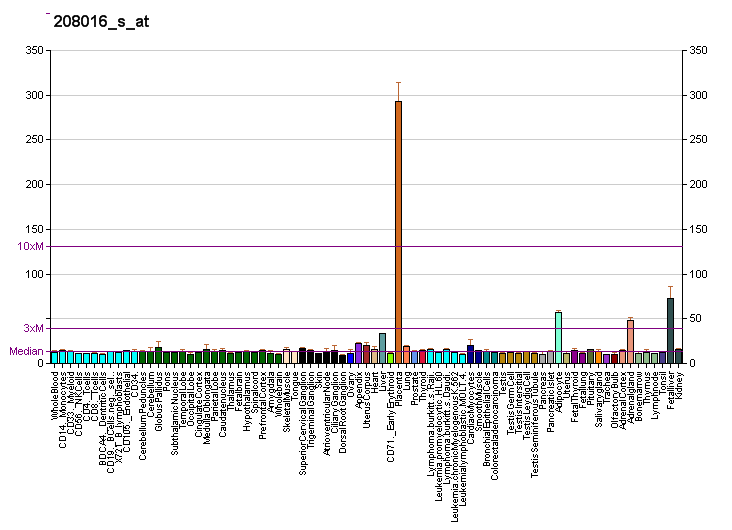
RNA expression pattern
Bgee	Human / Mouse (ortholog); Top expressed in: skin of hip; placenta; subcutaneous adipose tissue; liver; right lobe of liver; right adrenal gland; left adrenal gland; adrenal cortex; left adrenal cortex; right adrenal cortex / Top expressed in: adrenal gland; interventricular septum; left lobe of liver; lumbar spinal ganglion; prostate; myocardium of ventricle; human kidney; lobe of prostate; right kidney; sciatic nerve; More reference expression data
BioGPS	More reference expression data
Gene ontology
Molecular function	G protein-coupled receptor activity; angiotensin type II receptor activity; angiotensin type I receptor activity; signal transducer activity; bradykinin receptor binding; protein binding; protein heterodimerization activity
Cellular component	integral component of membrane; membrane; plasma membrane; integral component of plasma membrane; intracellular anatomical structure
Biological process	positive regulation of protein metabolic process; positive regulation of cytosolic calcium ion concentration involved in phospholipase C-activating G protein-coupled signaling pathway; positive regulation of inflammatory response; maintenance of blood vessel diameter homeostasis by renin-angiotensin; positive regulation of phospholipase A2 activity; regulation of renal sodium excretion; kidney development; positive regulation of cholesterol esterification; phospholipase C-activating angiotensin-activated signaling pathway; positive regulation of cytosolic calcium ion concentration; angiotensin-activated signaling pathway; renin-angiotensin regulation of aldosterone production; phospholipase C-activating G protein-coupled receptor signaling pathway; positive regulation of macrophage derived foam cell differentiation; positive regulation of reactive oxygen species metabolic process; regulation of vasoconstriction; low-density lipoprotein particle remodeling; regulation of cell population proliferation; regulation of cell growth; Rho protein signal transduction; positive regulation of NAD(P)H oxidase activity; regulation of inflammatory response; cell chemotaxis; regulation of systemic arterial blood pressure by renin-angiotensin; calcium-mediated signaling; signal transduction; blood vessel diameter maintenance; G protein-coupled receptor signaling pathway; positive regulation of blood vessel endothelial cell proliferation involved in sprouting angiogenesis; inflammatory response
Sources:Amigo / QuickGO
Orthologs
Databases	NCBI: entry; OMA: entry
Species	Human	Mouse
Entrez	185	11607
Ensembl	ENSG00000144891	ENSMUSG00000049115
UniProt	P30556	P29754
RefSeq (mRNA)	NM_032049; NM_000685; NM_004835; NM_009585; NM_031850 NM_001382736; NM_001382737	NM_177322
RefSeq (protein)	NP_000676; NP_004826; NP_033611; NP_114038; NP_114438 NP_001369665; NP_001369666	NP_796296
Location (UCSC)	Chr 3: 148.7 – 148.74 Mb	Chr 13: 30.52 – 30.57 Mb
PubMed search
- Wikidata
View/Edit Human	View/Edit Mouse

Angiotensin II receptor type 1 (AT1) is a G_{q/11}-coupled G protein-coupled receptor (GPCR) and the best characterized angiotensin receptor. It is encoded in humans by the AGTR1 gene. AT1 has vasopressor effects and regulates aldosterone secretion. It is an important effector controlling blood pressure and volume in the cardiovascular system. Angiotensin II receptor blockers are drugs indicated for hypertension, diabetic nephropathy and congestive heart failure.

== Signaling cascade ==
The angiotensin receptor is activated by the vasoconstricting peptide angiotensin II. The activated receptor in turn couples to G_{q/11} and thus activates phospholipase C and increases the cytosolic Ca^{2+} concentrations, which in turn triggers cellular responses such as stimulation of protein kinase C. Activated receptor also inhibits adenylate cyclase in hepatocytes and activates various tyrosine kinases.

== Function ==
The AT1 receptor mediates the major cardiovascular effects of angiotensin II. Effects include vasoconstriction, aldosterone synthesis and secretion, increased vasopressin secretion, cardiac hypertrophy, augmentation of peripheral noradrenergic activity, vascular smooth muscle cells proliferation, decreased renal blood flow, renal renin inhibition, renal tubular sodium reuptake, modulation of central sympathetic nervous system activity, cardiac contractility, central osmocontrol and extracellular matrix formation. The main function of angiotensin II in the brain is to stimulate drinking behavior, an effect that is mediated by the AT1 receptor.

== Clinical significance ==
Due to the hemodynamic pressure and volume effects mediated by AT1 receptors, AT1 receptor antagonists are widely prescribed drugs in the management of hypertension and stable heart failure.

== Animal studies ==
Elements of the renin-angiotensin system have been widely studied in a large variety of vertebrate animals including amphibians, reptiles, birds, and mammals.

AT1 receptor blockers have been shown to reduce fear memory recall in mice, but the reliability and relevance of this finding are to be determined.

== Gene ==
It was previously thought that a related gene, denoted as AGTR1B, existed; however, it is now believed that there is only one type 1 receptor gene in humans. At least four transcript variants have been described for this gene. Additional variants have been described but their full-length nature has not been determined. The entire coding sequence is contained in the terminal exon and is present in all transcript variants.

A huge number of polymorphisms is reported in the databases for AT1R which provide an avenue to explore these polymorphisms for their implications in protein structure, function and drug efficacy. Methods In the current study all the SNPs (10234) reported in NCBI were analyzed and SNPs which were important in protein structure and drug interactions were identified. Structures of these polymorphic forms were modeled and in silico drug interaction studies were carried out. Results Result of the interaction studies with polymorphism was in correlation with the reported case. Two SNP mutated structures of AT1R i.e. rs780860717 (G288T), rs868647200 (A182C) shows considerably less binding affinities in case of all angiotensin receptor blockers (ARBs).

== Interactions ==
Angiotensin II receptor type 1 has been shown to interact with Zinc finger and BTB domain-containing protein 16. The protein's mRNA has been reported to interact with Mir-132 microRNA as part of an RNA silencing mechanism that reduces receptor expression.
