= Tipepidine =

Chemical compound

Clinical data
- AHFS/Drugs.com: International Drug Names
- Routes of administration: Oral
- ATC code: R05DB24 (WHO)

Legal status
- Legal status: AU: S4 (Prescription only)

Identifiers
- IUPAC name: 3-(di-2-thienylmethylene)-1-methylpiperidine
- CAS Number: 5169-78-8
- PubChem CID: 5484
- ChemSpider: 5284
- UNII: 2260ZP67IT
- KEGG: D08604
- CompTox Dashboard (EPA): DTXSID2022626

Chemical and physical data
- Formula: C_{15}H_{17}NS_{2}
- Molar mass: 275.43 g·mol^{−1}
- 3D model (JSmol): Interactive image
- SMILES: s1cccc1/C(c2sccc2)=C3\CCCN(C)C3
- InChI: InChI=1S/C15H17NS2/c1-16-8-2-5-12(11-16)15(13-6-3-9-17-13)14-7-4-10-18-14/h3-4,6-7,9-10H,2,5,8,11H2,1H3; Key:JWIXXNLOKOAAQT-UHFFFAOYSA-N

Tipepidine (INN; also known as tipepidine hibenzate (JAN); brand names Asverin, Antupex, Asvelik, Asvex, Bitiodin, Cofdenin A, Hustel, Nodal, and Sotal) is a synthetic, non-opioid antitussive and expectorant of the thiambutene class. It acts as an inhibitor of G protein-coupled inwardly-rectifying potassium channels (GIRKs). The drug was discovered in the 1950s, and was developed in Japan in 1959. It is used as the hibenzate and citrate salts.

The usual dose is 20 mg every 4–6 hours. Possible side effects of tipepidine, especially in overdose, may include drowsiness, vertigo, delirium, disorientation, loss of consciousness, and confusion.

Tipepidine has been investigated as a potential psychiatric drug. It is being investigated in depression, obsessive-compulsive disorder, and attention-deficit hyperactivity disorder (ADHD). Through inhibition of GIRK channels, tipepidine increases dopamine levels in the nucleus accumbens, but without increasing locomotor activity or producing methamphetamine-like behavioral sensitization, and this action appears to be at least partly responsible for its antidepressant-like effects in rodents.

== See also ==
- Cough syrup
- Noscapine
- Codeine; Pholcodine
- Dextromethorphan; Dimemorfan
- Racemorphan; Dextrorphan; Levorphanol
- Butamirate
- Pentoxyverine
- Cloperastine; Levocloperastine
- Guaifenesin
- Timepidium bromide
