= Butamirate =

Cough suppressant

Clinical data
- Trade names: Acodeen, Codesin, Pertix, Sinecod, Sinecoden, Sinecodix
- AHFS/Drugs.com: International Drug Names
- ATC code: R05DB13 (WHO)

Pharmacokinetic data
- Protein binding: 98%
- Elimination half-life: 6 hours
- Excretion: 90% renal

Identifiers
- IUPAC name: 2-(2-diethylaminoethoxy)ethyl 2-phenylbutanoate
- CAS Number: 18109-80-3
- PubChem CID: 28892
- DrugBank: DB13731
- ChemSpider: 26873
- UNII: M75MZG2236
- KEGG: D07594
- ChEMBL: ChEMBL1332546
- CompTox Dashboard (EPA): DTXSID7048403
- ECHA InfoCard: 100.038.172

Chemical and physical data
- Formula: C_{18}H_{29}NO_{3}
- Molar mass: 307.434 g·mol^{−1}
- 3D model (JSmol): Interactive image
- SMILES: O=C(OCCOCCN(CC)CC)C(c1ccccc1)CC
- InChI: InChI=1S/C18H29NO3/c1-4-17(16-10-8-7-9-11-16)18(20)22-15-14-21-13-12-19(5-2)6-3/h7-11,17H,4-6,12-15H2,1-3H3; Key:DDVUMDPCZWBYRA-UHFFFAOYSA-N

Butamirate (or brospamin, trade names Acodeen, Codesin, Pertix, Sinecod, Sinecoden, Sinecodix) is a cough suppressant. It has been marketed in Europe and Mexico, but not in the United States.

It is sold in the form of lozenges, syrup, tablets, dragées, or pastilles as the citrate salt. Adverse effects can include nausea, diarrhea, vertigo, and exanthema.

== Pharmacology ==
A study found it to bind to the cough center in the medulla oblongata, more specifically the dextromethorphan-binding site in guinea pig brain with high affinity.

As a 2-(2-diethylaminoethoxy)ethyl ester, it is chemically related to oxeladin and pentoxyverine, which are in the same class. (Oxeladin has an additional ethyl group in its carboxylic acid, pentoxyverine has both ethyl groups of oxeladin replaced by one cyclopentyl in the same place.)

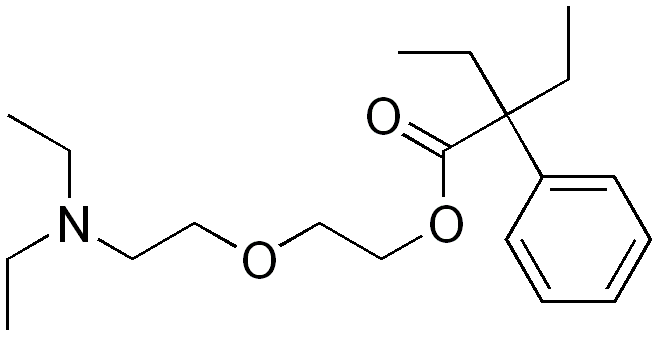
Oxeladin

Pentoxyverine

== See also ==
- Cough syrup
- Noscapine
- Codeine; Pholcodine
- Dextromethorphan; Dimemorfan
- Racemorphan; Dextrorphan; Levorphanol
- Pentoxyverine
- Tipepidine
- Cloperastine; Levocloperastine
