= Dimemorfan =

Cough suppressant

Clinical data
- Trade names: Astomin, Datosin, Gentus
- Other names: Dimemorfan phosphate; Dimemorphan; 3,17-Dimethylmorphinan
- AHFS/Drugs.com: International Drug Names
- ATC code: R05DA11 (WHO)

Identifiers
- IUPAC name: (4bS,8aS,9S)-3,11-Dimethyl-6,7,8,8a,9,10-hexahydro-5H-9,4b-(epiminoethano)phenanthrene
- CAS Number: 36309-01-0
- PubChem CID: 3037918
- DrugBank: DB13810
- ChemSpider: 16735785
- UNII: 623OAC38YU
- KEGG: D07848
- ChEMBL: ChEMBL2106325
- CompTox Dashboard (EPA): DTXSID301043335
- ECHA InfoCard: 100.048.134

Chemical and physical data
- Formula: C_{18}H_{25}N
- Molar mass: 255.405 g·mol^{−1}
- 3D model (JSmol): Interactive image
- SMILES: CC1=CC2=C(C[C@@H]3N(CC[C@@]42CCCC[C@H]34)C)C=C1
- InChI: InChI=1S/C18H25N/c1-13-6-7-14-12-17-15-5-3-4-8-18(15,16(14)11-13)9-10-19(17)2/h6-7,11,15,17H,3-5,8-10,12H2,1-2H3/t15-,17+,18+/m1/s1; Key:KBEZZLAAKIIPFK-NJAFHUGGSA-N

Dimemorfan (INN; JAN dimemorfan phosphate; also known as dimemorphan and 3,17-dimethylmorphinan; brand names Astomin, Dastosirr, and Tusben) is an antitussive (cough suppressant) of the morphinan family that is widely used in Japan and is also marketed in Spain and Italy. It was developed by Yamanouchi Pharmaceutical (now Astellas Pharma) and introduced in Japan in 1975. It was later introduced in Spain in 1981 and Japan in 1985.

== Side effects ==
Adverse effects include nausea, somnolence, dry mouth, and decreased appetite.

== Pharmacology ==
Dimemorfan is an analogue of dextromethorphan (DXM) and its active metabolite dextrorphan (DXO), and similarly to them, acts as a potent agonist of the σ_{1} receptor (K_{i} = 151 nM). However, unlike DXM and DXO, it does not act significantly as an NMDA receptor antagonist (K_{i} = 16,978 nM), and for this reason, lacks dissociative effects, thereby having reduced side effects and abuse potential in comparison. Similarly to DXM and DXO, dimemorfan has only relatively low affinity for the σ_{2} receptor (K_{i} = 4,421 nM).

== See also ==
- Cough syrup
- Noscapine
- Codeine; pholcodine
- Dextromethorphan
- Racemorphan; dextrorphan; levorphanol
- Butamirate
- Pentoxyverine
- Tipepidine
- Cloperastine
