= Cloperastine =

Chemical compound

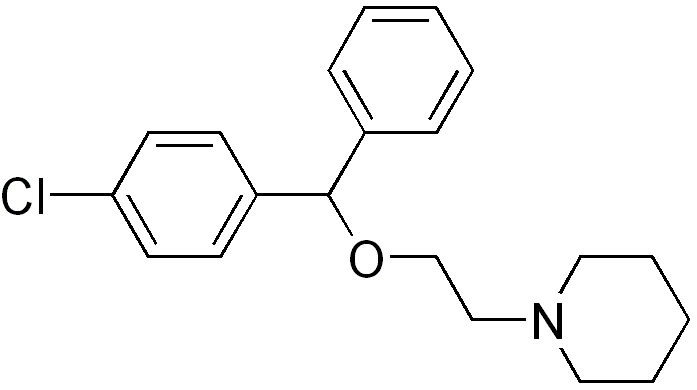

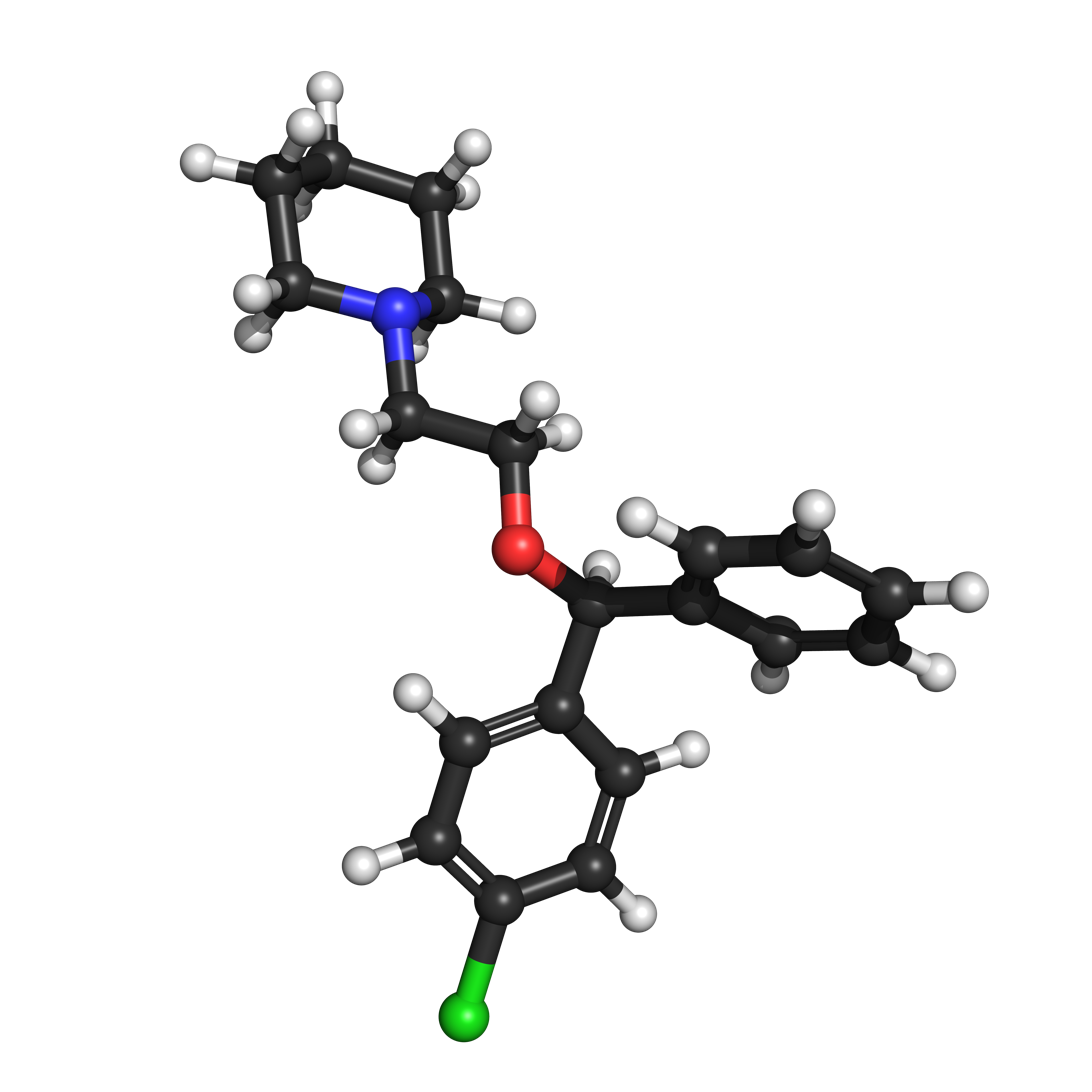
- Cloperastine structure (above); (S)-cloperastine 3D molecule (below)

Clinical data
- Other names: HT-11
- AHFS/Drugs.com: International Drug Names
- Routes of administration: Oral
- ATC code: R05DB21 (WHO)

Identifiers
- IUPAC name: 1-[2-[(4-Chlorophenyl)-phenyl-methoxy]ethyl]piperidine
- CAS Number: 3703-76-2
- PubChem CID: 2805
- DrugBank: DB09002
- ChemSpider: 2703
- UNII: 69M5L7BXEK
- KEGG: D03557
- ChEMBL: ChEMBL415087
- CompTox Dashboard (EPA): DTXSID7048532
- ECHA InfoCard: 100.020.948

Chemical and physical data
- Formula: C_{20}H_{24}ClNO
- Molar mass: 329.87 g·mol^{−1}
- 3D model (JSmol): Interactive image
- SMILES: Clc1ccc(cc1)C(OCCN2CCCCC2)c3ccccc3
- InChI: InChI=1S/C20H24ClNO/c21-19-11-9-18(10-12-19)20(17-7-3-1-4-8-17)23-16-15-22-13-5-2-6-14-22/h1,3-4,7-12,20H,2,5-6,13-16H2; Key:FLNXBVJLPJNOSI-UHFFFAOYSA-N

Cloperastine (INN) or cloperastin, in the forms of cloperastine hydrochloride (JAN) (brand names Hustazol, Nitossil, Seki) and cloperastine fendizoate, is an antitussive and antihistamine that is marketed as a cough suppressant in Japan, Hong Kong, Brazil and in some European countries. It was first introduced in 1972 in Japan, and then in Italy in 1981.

== Side effects ==
Adverse effects may include sedation, drowsiness, heartburn, and thickening of bronchial secretions.

== Pharmacology ==
The precise mechanism of action of cloperastine is not fully clear, but several different biological activities have been identified for the drug, of which include: ligand of the σ_{1} receptor (K_{i} = 20 nM) (likely an agonist), GIRK channel blocker (described as "potent"), antihistamine (K_{i} = 3.8 nM for the H_{1} receptor), and anticholinergic. It is thought that the latter two properties contribute to side effects, such as sedation and somnolence, while the former two may be involved in or responsible for the antitussive efficacy of cloperastine.

== Synthesis ==
Synthesis: Patents: Isomers: China:

The halogenation of 4-Chlorobenzhydrol [119-56-2] (1) with phosphorus tribromide in tetrachloromethane gives 1-(Bromophenylmethyl)-4-chlorobenzene [948-54-9] (2). Treatment with ethylenechlorohydrin (2-Chloroethanol) [107-07-3] (3) gives 1-(4-Chlorobenzhydryl)oxy-2-chloroethane [5321-46-0] (4). Reaction with piperidine (5) completes the synthesis of Cloperastine (6).

== See also ==
- Cough syrup
- Noscapine
- Codeine; Pholcodine
- Dextromethorphan; Dimemorfan
- Racemorphan; Dextrorphan; Levorphanol
- Butamirate
- Pentoxyverine
- Tipepidine
- Levocloperastine
