= C17H23NO =

The molecular formula C_{17}H_{23}NO (molar mass: 257.38 g/mol) may refer to:

- Alazocine (NANM)
- 3-Methoxymorphinan
- Morphanols
  - Dextrorphan
  - Levorphanol
  - Racemorphan
- Pirandamine
