= Noscapine =

Chemical compound

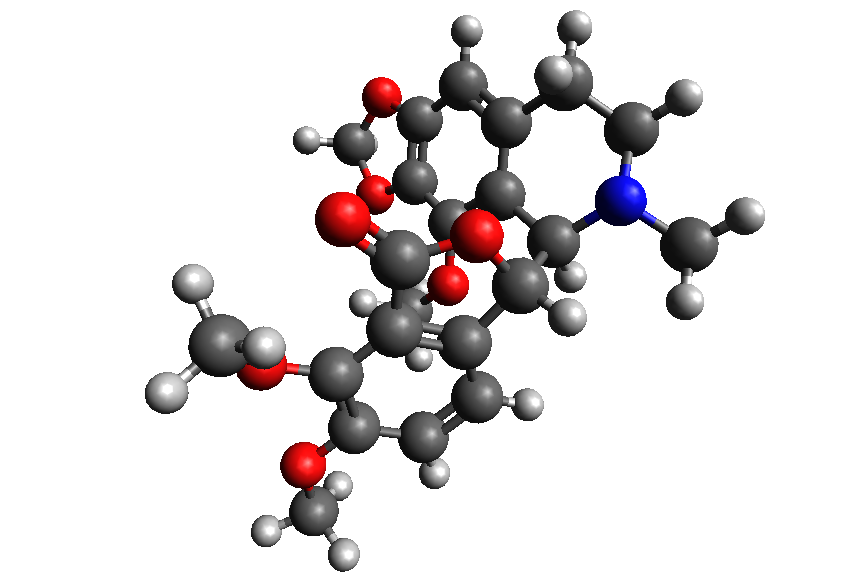

Clinical data
- Other names: Narcotine, nectodon, nospen, anarcotine
- AHFS/Drugs.com: International Drug Names
- Pregnancy category: Contraindicated
- ATC code: R05DA07 (WHO)

Legal status
- Legal status: AU: S2 (Pharmacy medicine); EU: BE, SE: OTC; In general: ℞ (Prescription only)

Pharmacokinetic data
- Bioavailability: ~30%
- Elimination half-life: 1.5–4 h (mean 2.5 h)

Identifiers
- IUPAC name: (3S)-6,7-Dimethoxy-3-[(5R)-5,6,7,8-tetrahydro-4-methoxy-6-methyl-1,3-dioxolo(4,5-g)isoquinolin-5-yl]-1(3H)-isobenzofuranone
- CAS Number: 128-62-1
- PubChem CID: 275196
- ChemSpider: 242139
- UNII: 8V32U4AOQU
- KEGG: D01036
- ChEBI: CHEBI:73237
- ChEMBL: ChEMBL364713
- CompTox Dashboard (EPA): DTXSID4023385
- ECHA InfoCard: 100.004.455

Chemical and physical data
- Formula: C_{22}H_{23}NO_{7}
- Molar mass: 413.426 g·mol^{−1}
- 3D model (JSmol): Interactive image
- SMILES: O=C2O[C@@H](c1ccc(OC)c(OC)c12)[C@@H]5N(C)CCc4c5c(OC)c3OCOc3c4
- InChI: InChI=1S/C22H23NO7/c1-23-8-7-11-9-14-20(29-10-28-14)21(27-4)15(11)17(23)18-12-5-6-13(25-2)19(26-3)16(12)22(24)30-18/h5-6,9,17-18H,7-8,10H2,1-4H3/t17-,18+/m1/s1; Key:AKNNEGZIBPJZJG-MSOLQXFVSA-N

Noscapine, also known as narcotine, nectodon, nospen, anarcotine and (archaic) opiane, is a benzylisoquinoline alkaloid of the phthalideisoquinoline structural subgroup, which has been isolated from numerous species of the Papaveraceae (poppy) family. It lacks effects associated with opioids such as sedation, euphoria, or analgesia (pain-relief) and lacks addictive potential. Noscapine is primarily used for its antitussive (cough-suppressing) effects.

== Medical uses ==
Noscapine is often used as an antitussive medication. A 2012 Dutch guideline, however, does not recommend its use for acute coughing.

== Side effects ==
- Nausea
- Vomiting
- Loss of coordination
- Hallucinations (auditory and visual)
- Loss of sexual drive
- Swelling of prostate
- Loss of appetite
- Dilated pupils
- Increased heart rate
- Shaking and muscle spasms
- Chest pain
- Increased alertness
- Increased wakefulness
- Loss of stereoscopic vision

== Interactions ==
Noscapine can increase the effects of centrally sedating substances such as alcohol and hypnotics.

The drug should not be taken with monoamine oxidase inhibitors (MAOIs), as unknown and potentially fatal effects may occur.

Noscapine should not be taken in conjunction with warfarin as the anticoagulant effects of warfarin may be increased.

== Biosynthesis ==
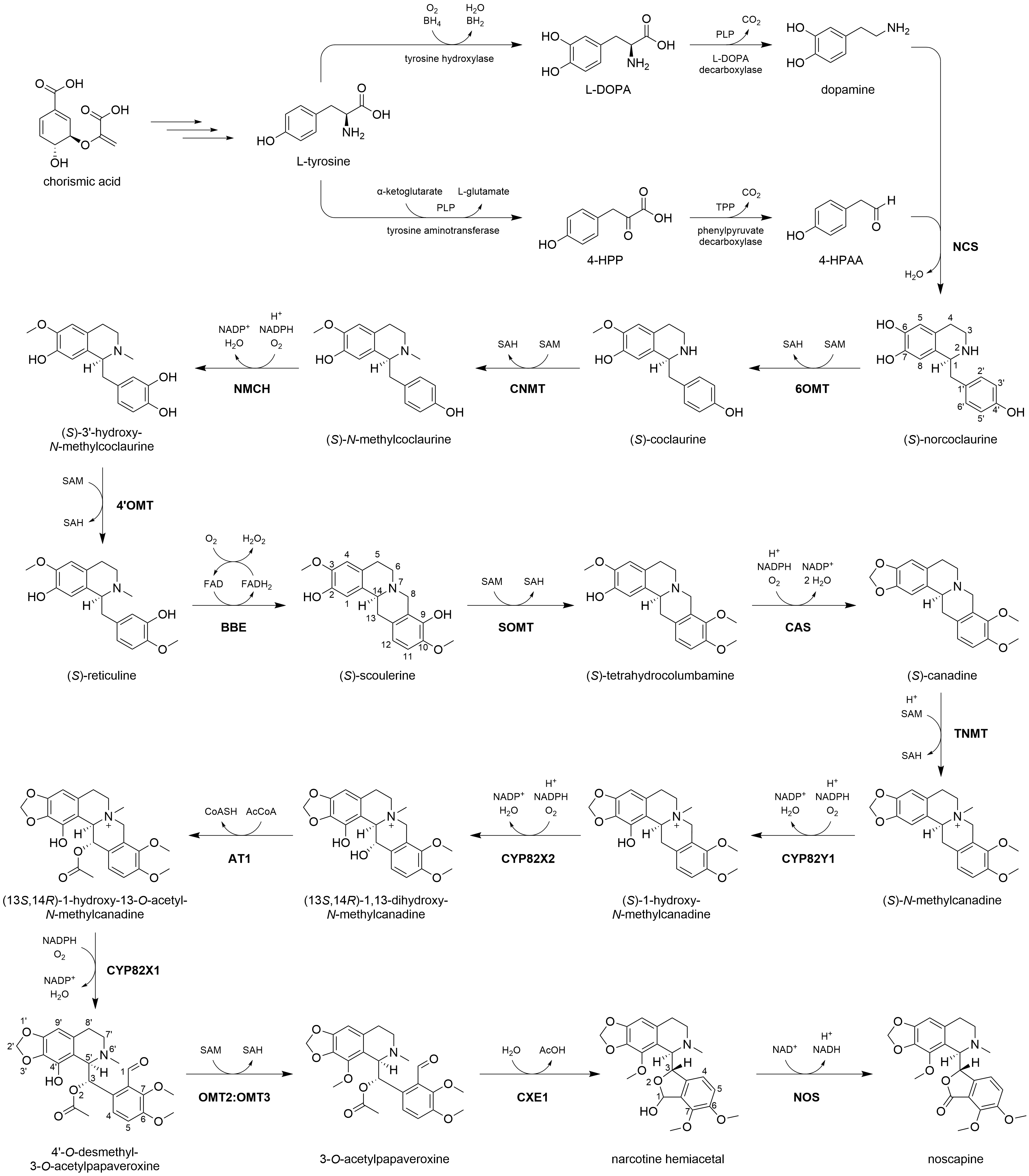
Noscapine biosynthesis in P. somniferum

The biosynthesis of noscapine in P. somniferum begins with chorismic acid, which is synthesized via the shikimate pathway from erythrose 4-phosphate and phosphoenolpyruvate. Chorismic acid is a precursor to the amino acid tyrosine, the source of nitrogen in benzylisoquinoline alkaloids. Tyrosine can undergo a PLP-mediated transamination to form 4-hydroxyphenylpyruvic acid (4-HPP), followed by a TPP-mediated decarboxylation to form 4-hydroxyphenylacetaldehyde (4-HPAA). Tyrosine can also be hydroxylated to form 3,4-dihydroxyphenylalanine (DOPA), followed by a PLP-mediated decarboxylation to form dopamine. Norcoclaurine synthase (NCS) catalyzes a Pictet-Spengler reaction between 4-HPAA and dopamine to synthesize (S)-norcoclaurine, providing the characteristic benzylisoquinoline scaffold. (S)-Norcoclaurine is sequentially 6-O-methylated (6OMT), N-methylated (CNMT), 3-hydroxylated (NMCH), and 4′-O-methylated (4′OMT), with the use of cofactors S-adenosyl-methionine (SAM) and NADP^{+} for methylations and hydroxylations, respectively. These reactions produce (S)-reticuline, a key branchpoint intermediate in the biosynthesis of benzylisoquinoline alkaloids.

The remainder of the noscapine biosynthetic pathway is largely governed by a single biosynthetic 10-gene cluster. Genes comprising the cluster encode enzymes responsible for nine of the eleven remaining chemical transformations. First, berberine bridge enzyme (BBE), an enzyme not encoded by the cluster, forms the fused four-ring structure in (S)-scoulerine. BBE uses O_{2} as an oxidant and is aided by cofactor flavin adenine dinucleotide (FAD). Next, an O-methyltransferase (SOMT) methylates the 9-hydroxyl group. Canadine synthase (CAS) catalyzes the formation of a unique C2-C3 methylenedioxy bridge in (S)-canadine. An N-methylation (TNMT) and two hydroxylations (CYP82Y1, CYP82X2) follow, aided by SAM and O_{2}/NADPH, respectively. The C13 alcohol is then acetylated by an acetyltransferase (AT1) using acetyl-CoA. Another cytochrome P450 enzyme (CYP82X1) catalyzes the hydroxylation of C8, and the newly formed hemiaminal spontaneously cleaves, yielding a tertiary amine and aldehyde. A methyltransferase heterodimer (OMT2:OMT3) catalyzes a SAM-mediated O-methylation on C4′. The O-acetyl group is then cleaved by a carboxylesterase (CXE1), yielding an alcohol which immediately reacts with the neighboring C1 aldehyde to form a hemiacetal in a new five-membered ring. The apparent counteractivity between AT1 and CXE1 suggests that acetylation in this context is employed as a protective group, preventing hemiacetal formation until the ester is enzymatically cleaved. Finally, an NAD^{+}-dependent short-chain dehydrogenase (NOS) oxidizes the hemiacetal to a lactone, completing noscapine biosynthesis.

== Mechanism of action ==
Noscapine's antitussive effects appear to be primarily mediated by its σ–receptor agonist activity. Evidence for this mechanism is suggested by experimental evidence in rats. Pretreatment with rimcazole, a σ-specific antagonist, causes a dose-dependent reduction in antitussive activity of noscapine. Noscapine, and its synthetic derivatives called noscapinoids, are known to interact with microtubules and inhibit cancer cell proliferation

== Structure analysis ==
The lactone ring is unstable and opens in basic media. The opposite reaction is presented in acidic media. The bond (C1−C3′) connecting the two optically active carbon atoms is also unstable. In aqueous solution of sulfuric acid and heating it dissociates into cotarnine (4-methoxy-6-methyl-5,6,7,8-tetrahydro-[1,3]dioxolo[4,5-g]isoquinoline) and opic acid (6-formyl-2,3-dimethoxybenzoic acid). When noscapine is reduced with zinc/HCl, the bond C1−C3′ saturates and the molecule dissociates into hydrocotarnine (2-hydroxycotarnine) and meconine (6,7-dimethoxyisobenzofuran-1(3H)-one).

== History ==
Noscapine was first isolated and characterized in chemical breakdown and properties in 1803 under the denomination of "Narcotine" by Jean-François Derosne, a French chemist in Paris. In 1817, Pierre-Jean Robiquet, another French chemist, reinvestigated the substance and named it "Narcotine". He proved narcotine and morphine to be distinct alkaloids in 1831. Finally, Pierre-Jean Robiquet conducted over 20 years between 1815 and 1835 a series of studies in the enhancement of methods for the isolation of morphine, and also isolated in 1832 another very important component of raw opium, that he called codeine, currently a widely used opium-derived compound.

== Society and culture ==
=== Recreational use ===
There are anecdotal reports of the recreational use of over-the-counter drugs in several countries, being readily available from local pharmacies without a prescription. The effects, beginning around 45 to 120 minutes after consumption, are similar to dextromethorphan and alcohol intoxication. Unlike dextromethorphan, noscapine is not an NMDA receptor antagonist.

=== Noscapine in heroin ===
Noscapine can survive the manufacturing processes of heroin and can be found in street heroin. This is useful for law enforcement agencies, as the amounts of contaminants can identify the source of seized drugs. In 2005 in Liège, Belgium, the average noscapine concentration was around 8%.

Noscapine has also been used to identify drug users who are taking street heroin at the same time as prescribed diamorphine. Since the diamorphine in street heroin is the same as the pharmaceutical diamorphine, examination of the contaminants is the only way to test whether street heroin has been used. Other contaminants used in urine samples alongside noscapine include papaverine and acetylcodeine. Noscapine is metabolised by the body, and is itself rarely found in urine, instead being present as the primary metabolites, cotarnine and meconine. Detection is performed by gas chromatography-mass spectrometry or liquid chromatography-mass spectrometry (LCMS) but can also use a variety of other analytical techniques.

== Research ==
=== Clinical trials ===
The efficacy of noscapine in the treatment of certain hematological malignancies has been explored in the clinic. Polyploidy induction by noscapine has been observed in vitro in human lymphocytes at high dose levels (>30 μM); however, low-level systemic exposure, e.g. with cough medications, does not appear to present a genotoxic hazard. The mechanism of polyploidy induction by noscapine is suggested to involve either chromosome spindle apparatus damage or cell fusion.

=== Noscapine biosynthesis reconstitution ===
Many of the enzymes in the noscapine biosynthetic pathway was elucidated by the discovery of a 10 gene "operon-like cluster" named HN1. In 2016, the biosynthetic pathway of noscapine was reconstituted in yeast cells, allowing the drug to be synthesised without the requirement of harvest and purification from plant material. In 2018, the entire noscapine pathway was reconstituted and produced in yeast from simple molecules. In addition, protein expression was optimised in yeast, allowing production of noscapine to be improved 18,000 fold. It is hoped that this technology could be used to produce pharmaceutical alkaloids such as noscapine which are currently expressed at too low a yield in plantae to be mass-produced, allowing them to become marketable therapeutic drugs.

=== Anticancer derivatives ===
Noscapine is itself an antimitotic agent, therefore its analogs have great potential as novel anti-cancer drugs. Analogs having significant cytotoxic effects through modified 1,3-benzodioxole moiety have been developed. Similarly, N-alkyl amine, 1,3-diynyl, 9-vinyl-phenyl and 9-arylimino derivatives of noscapine have also been developed. Their mechanism of action is through tubulin inhibition.

=== Anti-inflammatory effects ===
Various studies have indicated that noscapine has anti-inflammatory effects and significantly reduces the levels of proinflammatory factors such as interleukin 1β (IL-1β), IFN-c, and IL-6. In this regard, in another study, Khakpour et al. examined the effect of noscapine against carrageenan-induced inflammation in rats. They found that noscapine at a dose of 5 mg/kg body weight in three hours after the injection has the most anti-inflammatory effects. Moreover, they showed that the amount of inflammation reduction at this dose of noscapine is approximately equal to indomethacin, a standard anti-inflammatory medication. Furthermore, Shiri et al. concluded that noscapine prevented the progression of bradykinin-induced inflammation in the rat's foot by antagonising bradykinin receptors. In addition, Zughaier et al. evaluated the anti-inflammatory effects of brominated noscapine. The brominated form of noscapine has been shown to inhibit the secretion of the cytokine TNF-α and the chemokine CXCL10 from macrophages, thereby reducing inflammation without affecting macrophage survival. Furthermore, the bromated derivative of noscapine has about 5 to 40 times more potent effects than noscapine. Again, this brominated derivative also inhibits toll-like receptors (TLR), TNF-α, and nitric oxide (NO) in human and mouse macrophages without causing toxicity.

== See also ==
- Cough syrup
- Codeine; Pholcodine
- Dextromethorphan; Dimemorfan
- Racemorphan; Dextrorphan; Levorphanol
- Butamirate
- Pentoxyverine
- Tipepidine
- Cloperastine
- Levocloperastine
- Narceine, a related opium alkaloid.
