= Methorphan =

Group of stereoisomers

Racemethorphan

Levomethorphan (L), dextromethorphan (R)

Clinical data
- ATC code: None

Legal status
- Legal status: AU: S9 (Prohibited substance); BR: Class A1 (Narcotic drugs); CA: Schedule I; DE: Anlage I (Authorized scientific use only); UK: Class A; US: Schedule II; UN: Psychotropic Schedule I

Identifiers
- IUPAC name: 3-Methoxy-17-methylmorphinan
- CAS Number: 510-53-2
- PubChem CID: 3008
- ChemSpider: 2901
- UNII: 8YB8F78WM1
- ChEBI: CHEBI:146177
- ChEMBL: ChEMBL22207
- CompTox Dashboard (EPA): DTXSID60859238

Chemical and physical data
- Formula: C_{18}H_{25}NO
- Molar mass: 271.404 g·mol^{−1}
- 3D model (JSmol): Interactive image
- SMILES: CN1CCC23CCCCC2C1CC4=C3C=C(C=C4)OC
- InChI: InChI=1S/C18H25NO/c1-19-10-9-18-8-4-3-5-15(18)17(19)11-13-6-7-14(20-2)12-16(13)18/h6-7,12,15,17H,3-5,8-11H2,1-2H3; Key:MKXZASYAUGDDCJ-UHFFFAOYSA-N

Methorphan is an opioid drug that occurs in two isomeric forms, each with differing pharmacology and effects:

- Dextromethorphan – An over-the-counter cough suppressant, as well as dissociative hallucinogen.
- Levomethorphan – A potent opioid analgesic that was never clinically developed; a prodrug of the powerful opioid agonist analgesic levorphanol (Levo-Dromoran).

Racemethorphan is the racemic mixture of both of these stereoisomers. It is listed under the Single Convention on Narcotic Drugs 1961 and is therefore listed in the United States as a Controlled Substance, specifically as a Narcotic in Schedule II with an ACSCN of 9732 and an annual aggregate manufacturing quota of 3 grams in 2014. The salts in use are the hydrobromide (free base conversion ratio 0.770) and the tartrate (0.644).

== See also ==
- Morphinan
- Racemorphan
