= Dextromethorphan regulation by U.S. jurisdiction =

Opioid-based cough suppressant regulation in the US

Dextromethorphan is a cough suppressant found in several cold medications. Several U.S. states have begun regulating who, and under what circumstances, may purchase dextromethorphan-containing products. Not all states have regulations documented at this time, but this article contains all the states that have documentation.

== Alabama ==
Alabama Code Title 20. Food, Drugs, and Cosmetics § 20-2-2 only mentions dextromethorphan in relation to the fact that it is not defined as an opioid for the sake of regulation in this state. Alabama does not have any other provisions about the regulation of dextromethorphan at this time.

== Alaska ==
Alaska House Bill No. 125 placed regulations on who can sell and who can buy products that contain any level of dextromethorphan. The provider must check the identification of a person wishing to purchase dextromethorphan-containing products to verify that the purchaser is 18 years of age or older. There is a stipulation that identification is not required if the provider could reasonably assume that the purchaser is 25 years of age or older based on appearance. A person under 18 years of age may purchase a product containing dextromethorphan if they have a prescription for said product from a licensed practitioner.

Any provider who knowingly and willfully provides a product containing dextromethorphan to a person who does not meet these requirements is subject to a fine. The first violation has a fine of $150 and each subsequent fine is $250.

This Bill took effect May 1, 2016.

== Arizona ==
Arizona House Bill 2086 states that it is prohibited for any commercial entity knowingly or willingly sell or trade a dextromethorphan-containing product to a person under the age of 18. Inversely, it is prohibited for a person under the age of 18 to purchase any amount of dextromethorphan. Identification of age is required for purchase unless the purchaser outwardly appears to be above the age of 25. Other than identification of age, the bill does not require any additional provisions to control the purchase of dextromethorphan. These provisions do not apply to a person with a valid prescription purchasing a product containing dextromethorphan.

A person who violates the provisions of the bill will be subject to a first time warning and subsequent penalties of fifty dollars for additional offenses.

This Bill took effect April 24, 2014.

== Arkansas ==
Arkansas does not have any documented regulation pertaining to the purchase of dextromethorphan available at this time.

== California ==
California bill S.B. 514 states that a manufacturer, wholesaler, retailer, or other person is prohibited from selling or transferring a specified substance to a person under the age of 18, except as specified. Although this bill extended to the drugs ephedrine and pseudoephedrine, it was used as a starting point for building the bill for dextromethorphan. This bill provided that any infraction of a provider in an over-the-counter sale who willfully and knowingly supply, deliver, or give possession of a non-prescription drug that contains dextromethorphan to a person under the age of 18 would incur a fine of $250. The bill also mentions that proof that identification at the time of purchase was demanded by the provider can be used as a defense in criminal prosecution. The bill also states that a retail clerk who fails to identify the age of the purchaser would not be found guilty unless the retail clerk was a willful participant in an ongoing conspiracy to sell dextromethorphan to minors.

This bill took effect January 1, 2012.

== Colorado ==
Colorado House Bill 18-1307 states that it is unlawful for a store to provide a product containing any amount of dextromethorphan to a person that is under the age of 18. Providers are required to obtain proof that the purchaser is above the age of 18 before the sale unless the provider can reasonably assume that the purchaser is above the age of 18 on the basis of appearance. This bill does not place regulations on whether the store selling dextromethorphan must put the product in a special area in the store, whether access to the dextromethorphan products should be restricted, or whether they store should keep transactions records.

If a provider violates these regulations, they are first subject to a written warning and then a fine of $200 for every following offense.

This bill took effect August 8, 2018.

== Connecticut ==
Connecticut has some documented regulation pertaining to the purchase of dextromethorphan available at this time.

== Delaware ==
Delaware House Bill 329 states that no commercial entity shall provide a product containing dextromethorphan to a person under the age of 18 and that a person under the age of 18 shall not purchase a product containing dextromethorphan. Providers are required to acquire identification of age from any on they presume to be under the age of 25. This bill does not place regulation on whether the commercial entity is required to place any barrier on access to the product beyond identification. The stipulations of age are not required when the dextromethorphan containing produce it purchased with a valid prescription.

If a provider is found in violation of the regulations outlined in this bill, they will be subject to a written warning from the Office of Controlled Substances for the first violation. A second violation will result in a fine of $150. The third and each subsequent violation will result in a fine of $250.

This bill took effect June 16, 2016.

== Florida ==
Florida Senate Bill 938 states that a manufacturer, distributor, or retailer, or its employees and representatives is prohibited to provide a dextromethorphan containing product to a person under the age of 18 and that a person under the age of 18 is prohibited from purchasing a product containing dextromethorphan. The employee or representative involved in the sale of dextromethorphan is required to obtain proof of age of the purchaser if that purchaser could be presumed to be under the age of 25 based on appearance.

If a provider is found to be in violation of these regulations, they are subject to a first time written warning and for subsequent violations subject to a civil citation that will each incur a fine of $100.

This bill took effect January 1, 2017.

== Georgia ==
Georgia does not have any documented regulation pertaining to the purchase of dextromethorphan available at this time.

== Hawaii ==
Hawaii does not have any documented regulation pertaining to the purchase of dextromethorphan available at this time.

== Idaho ==
Idaho does not have any documented regulation pertaining to the purchase of dextromethorphan available at this time.

== Illinois ==
Illinois has banned the sale of pure forms of dextromethorphan.

== Indiana ==
Indiana does not have any documented regulation pertaining to the purchase of dextromethorphan available at this time.

== Iowa ==
Iowa does not have any documented regulation pertaining to the purchase of dextromethorphan available at this time.

== Kansas ==
Kansas does not have any documented regulation pertaining to the purchase of dextromethorphan available at this time.

== Kentucky ==
Kentucky House Bill 24 states that a person, "other than a medical facility, medical practitioner, pharmacist, pharmacy intern, pharmacy technician, or pharmacy licensed" is prohibited to possess more than one gram of pure dextromethorphan or a dextromethorphan that has been extracted from other medications. A person under the age or 18 is prohibited from purchasing a product containing dextromethorphan and are prohibited to use false identification in the pursuit of purchase. No person is allowed to purchase a dextromethorphan containing product with the intent to provide it to a person under the age of 18. The provider of a dextromethorphan containing product must acquire proof of age if they believe that the potential purchaser is below the age of 18.

Any person found to possess more than one gram of pure dextromethorphan without the required credentials is subject to a $1000 fine for the first offense and a $2500 fine for each subsequent offense.

A person who is found to be assisting a person under the age of 18 in acquiring a product containing dextromethorphan is subject to a $100 fine for the first offense and a $200 fine for each subsequent offense.

A person under the age of 18 who attempts to purchase a product that contains dextromethorphan, and uses false identification to do so, is subject to a $25 fine for the first offense, a $100 fine for the second offense, and a $200 for the third and each subsequent offense.

This bill took effect March 19, 2015.

== Louisiana ==
Louisianan House Bill 514 states that a person under the age of 18 is prohibited to purchase, or attempt to purchase, any nonprescription products that contain dextromethorphan. This bill also states that a provider is prohibited to sell a product that contains dextromethorphan to a person under the age of 18 unless said purchaser has a valid prescription for the product. This bill also requires that identification is provided at the time of purchase and that the identification is issued by either a state or the United States government, such as a license or passport.

This bill took effect August 1, 2014.

== Maine ==
Maine does not have any documented regulation pertaining to the purchase of dextromethorphan available at this time.

== Maryland ==
Maryland Senate Bill 939 states that a person is prohibited to purchase a dextromethorphan containing product unless the potential purchaser provides government issued photographic identification proving age of at least 18 years and signs a receipt documenting the date and time of the transaction, the name and address of the purchaser, and the amount of product purchased. Each establishment that provides dextromethorphan containing products is required to maintain records of purchase and post signs describing the restriction of dextromethorphan and the health reasons behind the restriction. A person is prohibited to purchase more than 3.6 grams of dextromethorphan containing products within a 30-day period unless it is in pursuant to a valid prescription.

Any person found in violation of this bill is guilty of a misdemeanor and subject to a fine of $1000, or imprisonment of not more than one year, or both the fine and the imprisonment.

This bill was not passed.

== Massachusetts ==
The Massachusetts legislature considered legislation in the 2021-2022 session to ban the sale of products containing dextromethorphan to minors, but the bill did not advance beyond the Public Health Committee.

== Michigan ==
Michigan Governor Gretchen Whitmer signed HB 4412, legislation to combat teen abuse of over-the-counter (OTC) medicines containing the cough suppressant dextromethorphan (DXM) by prohibiting the sale of DXM-containing products to minors without a prescription. The new law went into effect on July 1, 2020. A person making a retail sale of a finished drug product containing any quantity of dextromethorphan must require and obtain proof of age from the purchaser before completing the sale, unless from the purchaser's outward appearance the person making the sale would reasonably presume the purchaser to be at least 25 years of age.

== Minnesota ==
Minnesota does not have any documented regulation pertaining to the purchase of dextromethorphan available at this time.

== Mississippi ==
Mississippi does not have any documented regulation pertaining to the purchase of dextromethorphan available at this time.

== Missouri ==
Missouri does not have any documented regulation pertaining to the purchase of dextromethorphan available at this time.

== Montana ==
Montana does not have any documented regulation pertaining to the purchase of dextromethorphan available at this time.

== Nebraska ==
Nebraska does not have any documented regulation pertaining to the purchase of dextromethorphan available at this time.

== Nevada ==
Nevada Senate Bill 159 states that it is prohibited to provide a dextromethorphan containing product to a person under the age of 18. A person under the age of 18 is prohibited from purchasing a product that contains dextromethorphan unless they have a valid prescription. The provider is required to obtain identification for proof of age unless the provider can presume that the purchaser is above the age of 18 by the purchaser's appearance.

If a provider is found to be in violation, they are subject to a warning for the first offense and a civil penalty of $50 for each subsequent violation.

This bill took effect June 6, 2017.

== New Hampshire ==
New Hampshire does not have any documented regulation pertaining to the purchase of dextromethorphan available at this time.

== New Jersey ==
New Jersey Assembly Bill 622 states that a person will not directly or indirectly sell or offer to sell any product containing any amount of dextromethorphan to a person under the age of 18. The bill then goes on to state the defenses a provider of dextromethorphan could use in the event that they are in violation of the bill. If the person purchasing the dextromethorphan provided false identification to the time of purchase, then the provider would not be held liable for violating this bill. Also, if the person purchasing the dextromethorphan product could be presumed to be of the legal age, then the purchaser will not be held liable. This differs from others states due to the fact that the provider need only reasonably assume that the purchaser is above the age of 18 rather than above the age of 25.

If the provider does not meet these defense standards, then they will receive a fine of no more than $750.

== New Mexico ==
New Mexico does not have any documented regulation pertaining to the purchase of dextromethorphan available at this time.

== New York ==
New York Senate Bill S696B states that no provider shall sell a dextromethorphan containing product to a person under the age of 18 without a valid prescription. Providers are required to obtain identification of age for anyone who looks to be under the age of 25 based on appearance.

Any provider found to be in violation of this bill is subject to a fine of $250 for each violation.

This bill took effect January 23, 2014.

== North Carolina ==
All retailers, such as Walmart restrict the product to persons over the age of 18 and requires state issued identification (Driver's license) in order to complete the sale of said product.

== North Dakota ==
North Dakota does not have any documented regulation pertaining to the purchase of dextromethorphan available at this time.

== Ohio ==
Effective September 30, 2021, HB 9 will prohibit retailers (including pharmacies) from selling, supplying, delivering, or giving a drug that contains dextromethorphan to a person under 18 years of age, unless the person has prescription for the product. Under the new law, ORC 2925.62, retailers (or employee of retailers) are required to request proof of age and identity for all purchases of dextromethorphan products who appear to be under the age of 25.

== Oklahoma ==
Oklahoma does not have any documented regulation pertaining to the purchase of dextromethorphan available at this time.

== Oregon ==
Oregon Senate Bill 743 states that a provider is prohibited to provide a dextromethorphan containing product to a person under the age of 18 and an individual under the age of 18 is prohibited to purchase a dextromethorphan containing product. The provider is required to obtain identification for proof of age unless the provider can reasonable presume, based on the purchaser's appearance, that the purchaser is 25 years of age or older.

Any provider found to be in violation of this bill is subject to a warning from law enforcement for the first violation, a fine of $150 for the second violation, and a fine of $250 for the third violation and each subsequent violation.

Any purchaser found to be in violation of this bill is subject to a warning from law enforcement for the first violation and a fine of $50 for the second violation and each subsequent violation.

This bill took effect January 1, 2018.

== Pennsylvania ==
Pennsylvania does not have any documented regulation pertaining to the purchase of dextromethorphan available at this time.

== Rhode Island ==
In 2006, a bill was introduced that would have stated that a provider is prohibited to provide a dextromethorphan containing product to a person under the age of 18 and an individual under the age of 18 is prohibited to purchase a dextromethorphan containing product. The provider is required to obtain identification for proof of age unless the provider can reasonable presume, based on the purchaser's appearance, that the purchaser is 25 years of age or older.

Any provider found to be in violation of this bill is subject to a warning from law enforcement for the first violation, a fine of $150 for the second violation, and a fine of $250 for the third violation and each subsequent violation.

Any purchaser found to be in violation of this bill is subject to a warning from law enforcement for the first violation and a fine of $50 for the second violation and each subsequent violation.

This bill did not pass.

== South Carolina ==
South Carolina does not have any documented regulation pertaining to the purchase of dextromethorphan available at this time.

Some pharmacies, such as Walgreens will ask for your ID despite there being no regulations set in place, pertaining to the purchase of dextromethorphan.

== South Dakota ==
South Dakota does not have any documented regulation pertaining to the purchase of dextromethorphan available at this time.

== Tennessee ==
Tennessee Senate Bill 45 states that it is prohibited that a provider to provide a dextromethorphan containing product to a person under the age of 18. This bill also states that it is prohibited for a person under the age of 18 to purchase a dextromethorphan containing product. These sections do not apply to a person under the age of 18 that is an emancipated minor or if the product was purchased in pursuit to a valid prescription. The provider is required to obtain identification for proof of age or emancipation before completing the sale. Identification is not required if the provider can assume that the purchaser is above the age of 35 based on appearance.

A provider found in violation of this bill has committed a Class B misdemeanor and is subject to a fine of $100 for the first offense and a fine of $500 for the second offense and each subsequent offense.

This bill took effect on July 1, 2015

== Texas ==
As of September 1, 2019, purchasers of dextromethorphan in Texas must be 18 years old.

== Utah ==
Utah does not have any documented regulation pertaining to the purchase of dextromethorphan available at this time.

== Vermont ==
Vermont does not have any documented regulation pertaining to the purchase of dextromethorphan available at this time.

== Virginia ==
Virginia Senate Bill 213 states that no pharmacy or retail entity shall provide a dextromethorphan containing product to a person under the age of 18. It is also prohibited for a person under the age of 18 to purchase dextromethorphan. The retail entity providing the dextromethorphan is required to obtain identification that the purchaser is above the age of 18 at the time of purchase unless the purchaser can be presumed to be above the age of 25 based on appearance.

If a provider is found in violation of this bill, the provider will receive a notice of noncompliance and then a $25 civil penalty for each subsequent violation.

This bill took effect January 1, 2015.

== Washington ==
Washington Second Substitute House Bill 2163 states that a provider of a dextromethorphan containing product is required to obtain proof of age from a purchaser unless the provider can assume that the purchaser is about the age of 25 based on appearance. It is prohibited for a provider to provide a dextromethorphan containing product to a person under the age of 18 and it is prohibited for a person under the age of 18 to purchase a dextromethorphan containing product. These provisions do not apply to a person under the age of 18 who is emancipated, and provides proof of emancipation at the time of purchase, or to a person under the age of 18 who is actively enrolled in the military, and can provide their military identification card at the time of purchase.

A provider or purchaser found in violation of this bill is subject to a written warning from law enforcement for the first offense and is guilty of a class 1 civil infraction.

This bill took effect July 1, 2015.

== West Virginia ==
A person may not knowingly or willfully sell or trade a finished drug product containing any quantity of dextromethorphan to a person under 18 years of age.

A person under 18 years of age, unless an emancipated minor, may not purchase a finished drug product containing any quantity of dextromethorphan.

A person making a retail sale of a finished drug product containing any quantity of dextromethorphan shall require and obtain proof of age from the purchaser before completing the sale, unless from the purchaser’s outward appearance the person making the sale would reasonably presume the purchaser to be at least 25 years of age.

This section does not apply to a medication containing dextromethorphan that is sold pursuant to a valid prescription.

(Any person violating the provisions of this section is guilty of a misdemeanor and shall be fined not less than $100 nor more than $250.

== Wisconsin ==
Wisconsin Assembly Bill 681 states that a provider is prohibited from providing a dextromethorphan containing product to a person under the age of 18 and a person under the age of 18 is prohibited to purchase a dextromethorphan containing product. This part of the bill does not apply to a person under the age of 18 purchasing a dextromethorphan containing product pursuant to a prescription. A provider is required to obtain proof of age from a purchaser who, based on appearance, could be presumed to be under the age of 25.

A person in violation of this bill is subject to a fine of $250 for each violation.

This bill took effect January 1, 2019.

== Wyoming ==
Wyoming does not have any documented regulation pertaining to the purchase of dextromethorphan available, at this time.

== See also ==
- Recreational use of dextromethorphan
