= Racemorphan =

Racemic mixture

Legal status
- Legal status: AU: S9 (Prohibited substance); BR: Class A1 (Narcotic drugs); CA: Schedule I; DE: Anlage II (Authorized trade only, not prescriptible); UK: Class A; US: Schedule II; UN: Psychotropic Schedule I

Identifiers
- IUPAC name: (±)-17-Methylmorphinan-3-ol
- CAS Number: 297-90-5 5985-35-3 (HBr)
- PubChem CID: 3918
- ChemSpider: 3781
- UNII: V7R79HN3XD
- ChEMBL: ChEMBL20803
- ECHA InfoCard: 100.005.499

Chemical and physical data
- Formula: C_{17}H_{23}NO
- Molar mass: 257.377 g·mol^{−1}
- 3D model (JSmol): Interactive image
- SMILES: CN1CCC23CCCCC2C1Cc4ccc(O)cc34
- InChI: InChI=1S/C17H23NO/c1-18-9-8-17-7-3-2-4-14(17)16(18)10-12-5-6-13(19)11-15(12)17/h5-6,11,14,16,19H,2-4,7-10H2,1H3; Key:JAQUASYNZVUNQP-UHFFFAOYSA-N

Racemorphan, or morphanol, is the racemic mixture of the two stereoisomers of 17-methylmorphinan-3-ol, each with differing pharmacology and effects:

- Dextrorphan – an antitussive and dissociative hallucinogen (NMDA receptor antagonist)
- Levorphanol – an opioid analgesic

Its analgesic activity is intermediate between Dextrorphan and Levorphanol.

Racemorphan itself is under international control per the Single Convention on Narcotic Drugs 1961 and is therefore listed as a Schedule II Narcotic controlled substance in the US Controlled Substances Act 1970; it has an ACSCN of 9733 and in 2014 it had an aggregate annual manufacturing quota of zero. The salts in use are hydrobromide (free base conversion ratio 0.741), hydrochloride (0.876), and tartrate (0.632).

== See also ==
- Levallorphan
- Methorphan
- Morphinan
- Cyclorphan
- Cough syrup
- Noscapine
- Codeine; Pholcodine
- Dextromethorphan; Dimemorfan
- Dextrorphan; Levorphanol
- Butamirate
- Pentoxyverine
- Tipepidine
