= Spasmofen =

Medication

Spasmofen is the trade name for a combination drug used to relieve symptoms of painful cramps in smooth muscle, mainly in the bile ducts, urinary tract or gastrointestinal tract. The onset of relief can be felt after approximately 20 minutes, and last 3-5 hours.

It consists of the following drugs:

- methscopolamine, a muscarinic antagonist that decreases muscular spasms
- codeine, an analgesic of the opioid class
- morphine, also an opioid
- papaverine, an opium alkaloid antispasmodic drug
- noscapine
