= Piperidylthiambutene =

Chemical compound

Clinical data
- ATC code: none

Identifiers
- IUPAC name: 1-[4,4-Di(thiophen-2-yl)but-3-en-2-yl]piperidine
- CAS Number: 54160-31-5
- PubChem CID: 3041503
- ChemSpider: 2304772
- UNII: 4BU0BCP2E1
- CompTox Dashboard (EPA): DTXSID50903299

Chemical and physical data
- Formula: C_{17}H_{21}NS_{2}
- Molar mass: 303.48 g·mol^{−1}
- 3D model (JSmol): Interactive image
- Melting point: 188 to 189 °C (370 to 372 °F)
- SMILES: C1CCCCN1C(C)C=C(c3cccs3)c2sccc2
- InChI: InChI=1S/C17H21NS2/c1-14(18-9-3-2-4-10-18)13-15(16-7-5-11-19-16)17-8-6-12-20-17/h5-8,11-14H,2-4,9-10H2,1H3; Key:FQRWJLVMJCKSME-UHFFFAOYSA-N

Piperidylthiambutene (Piperidinohton) is a synthetic opioid analgesic drug from the thiambutene family, which has around the same potency as morphine. Piperidylthiambutene is structurally distinct from fentanyl, its analogues, and other synthetic opioids previously reported. If sold or obtained for the purpose of human consumption it could be considered a controlled substance analogue in some countries such as the US, Australia and New Zealand. Piperidylthiambutene has been sold as a designer drug, first appearing in late 2018.

== Synthesis ==
Patent:

The Grignard reaction between 3-Piperidinobutyric acid ethyl ester, CID:10774378 (1) and 2-Bromothiophene [1003-09-4] (2) gives 3. Dehydration in acid completes the synthesis.
