= Guaifenesin/codeine =

Combination medication

Combination of
- Guaifenesin: Expectorant
- Codeine: Antitussive

Clinical data
- AHFS/Drugs.com: Monograph; Multum Consumer Information
- License data: US DailyMed: Guaifenesin codeine
- Routes of administration: By mouth
- ATC code: R05FA02 (WHO)

Legal status
- Legal status: US: Schedule V

Identifiers
- KEGG: D02263

Guaifenesin/codeine is a fixed-dose combination cold medicine used for the treatment of cough. It contains guaifenesin, an expectorant; and codeine, as the phosphate, an opioid antitussive. It is taken by mouth.

It was approved for medical use in the United States in 2006. In 2023, it was the 265th most commonly prescribed medication in the United States, with more than 900,000 prescriptions.

== Society and culture ==
=== Brand names ===
Guaifenesin/codeine is available under multiple brand names including Allfen CD, Antituss AC, Bitex, Bron-Tuss, Brontex, Cheracol with Codeine, Cheratussin, Cheratussin AC, Codafen, Codar GF, Coditussin AC, Dex-Tuss, Diabetic Tussin C, Duraganidin NR, ExeClear-C, G Tussin AC, Gani-Tuss NR, Glydeine, Guaiatussin AC, Guaiatussin AC Sugar Free, Guaifen AC, Guaifenesin AC, Guiatuss AC, Guiatussin with Codeine, Halotussin AC, Iophen, Iophen-C NR, M-Clear, M-Clear WC, Mar-cof CG, Maxi-Tuss AC, Mytussin AC, Relcof C, Robafen AC, Robichem AC, Robitussin AC, Romilar AC, Tussi Organidin, Tussiden C, Tusso-C, Virtussin A/C, and Virtussin AC.
