= Pyrrolidinylthiambutene =

Chemical compound

Clinical data
- ATC code: none

Identifiers
- IUPAC name: 1-(1-methyl-3,3-di-2-thienylprop-2-en-1-yl)pyrrolidine
- CAS Number: 785722-57-8
- PubChem CID: 57503828
- UNII: 3SFP7VPW6S

Chemical and physical data
- Formula: C_{16}H_{19}NS_{2}
- Molar mass: 289.46 g·mol^{−1}
- 3D model (JSmol): Interactive image
- Melting point: 167 to 169 °C (333 to 336 °F)
- SMILES: C2CCCN2C(C)C=C(c1sccc1)c3sccc3
- InChI: InChI=1S/C16H19NS2/c1-13(17-8-2-3-9-17)12-14(15-6-4-10-18-15)16-7-5-11-19-16/h4-7,10-13H,2-3,8-9H2,1H3; Key:PIJLUNXAEWABFK-UHFFFAOYSA-N

Pyrrolidinylthiambutene is an opioid analgesic drug from the thiambutene family with around 3/4 of the potency of morphine. It would be considered an illegal controlled substance analogue in some countries such as the US, Australia and New Zealand, but is legal in countries not possessing a controlled-substances-analog-act equivalent.
