= Narceine =

Names
- Preferred IUPAC name 6-({6-[2-(Dimethylamino)ethyl]-4-methoxy-2H-1,3-benzodioxol-5-yl}acetyl)-2,3-dimethoxybenzoic acid

Identifiers
CAS Number	131-28-2
3D model (JSmol)	Interactive image
ChemSpider	8246
ECHA InfoCard	100.004.566
EC Number	235-480-2
KEGG	C09591
PubChem CID	8564
UNII	CTT09X2F1M
CompTox Dashboard (EPA)	DTXSID40156833
- InChI: InChI=1S/C23H27NO8/c1-24(2)9-8-13-10-18-22(32-12-31-18)20(29-4)15(13)11-16(25)14-6-7-17(28-3)21(30-5)19(14)23(26)27/h6-7,10H,8-9,11-12H2,1-5H3,(H,26,27) Key: DEXMFYZAHXMZNM-UHFFFAOYSA-N; InChI=1/C23H27NO8/c1-24(2)9-8-13-10-18-22(32-12-31-18)20(29-4)15(13)11-16(25)14-6-7-17(28-3)21(30-5)19(14)23(26)27/h6-7,10H,8-9,11-12H2,1-5H3,(H,26,27) Key: DEXMFYZAHXMZNM-UHFFFAOYAJ
- SMILES: CN(C)CCC1=CC2=C(C(=C1CC(=O)C3=C(C(=C(C=C3)OC)OC)C(=O)O)OC)OCO2

Properties
Chemical formula	C_{23}H_{27}NO_{8}
Molar mass	445.468 g·mol^{−1}
- Except where otherwise noted, data are given for materials in their standard state (at 25 °C [77 °F], 100 kPa). Infobox references

Narceine (also spelled narcein and narceen) is an opium alkaloid produced by the Papaver somniferum (opium poppy) plant. It is a bitter, crystalline compound with narcotic effects. It was formerly used as a substitute for morphine. Its name is derived from the Greek νάρκη (nárkē), meaning numbness, and the postfix -ine referring to an alkaloid.

== See also ==
- Noscapine, a related alkaloid
