= 3-Methoxymorphinan =

Chemical compound

Legal status
- Legal status: US: uncontrolled

Identifiers
- CAS Number: 1531-25-5
- PubChem CID: 5484286
- ChemSpider: 10207434
- UNII: 497WV2EY4T
- ECHA InfoCard: 100.014.764

Chemical and physical data
- Formula: C_{17}H_{23}NO
- Molar mass: 257.377 g·mol^{−1}
- InChI: InChI=1S/C17H23NO/c1-19-13-6-5-12-10-16-14-4-2-3-7-17(14,8-9-18-16)15(12)11-13/h5-6,11,14,16,18H,2-4,7-10H2,1H3/t14-,16+,17+/m0/s1; Key:ILNSWVUXAPSPEH-USXIJHARSA-N

3-Methoxymorphinan is an inactive metabolite of both dextromethorphan and levomethorphan, and has been shown to produce local anesthetic effects. It is the CYP3A4 metabolite of the aforementioned drugs, and is itself metabolized by the liver enzyme CYP2D6.

== See also ==
- 3-hydroxymorphinan
- Dextrorphan
- Dextromethorphan
- Levomethorphan
- Morphinan
