= Thiambutenes =

Group of chemical compounds

Thiambutene

Clinical data
- ATC code: none

Identifiers
- IUPAC name: (RS)-4,4-dithiophen-2-yl-but-3-en-2-amine
- CAS Number: 857725-50-9
- UNII: 7U6X3BAX5U

Chemical and physical data
- Formula: C_{12}H_{13}NS_{2}
- Molar mass: 235.36 g·mol^{−1}
- 3D model (JSmol): Interactive image
- Chirality: Racemic mixture
- Melting point: 174 to 175 °C (345 to 347 °F)
- SMILES: s1cccc1C(=CC(N)C)c2sccc2

The Thiambutenes are a family of opioid analgesic drugs developed at the British research laboratory of Burroughs-Wellcome in the late 1940s. The parent compound thiambutene has no analgesic effects, but several compounds from this group are analgesics with around the same potency as morphine.

Notable compounds include dimethylthiambutene, diethylthiambutene, ethylmethylthiambutene, pyrrolidinylthiambutene and piperidylthiambutene. Of these, ethylmethylthiambutene is the most potent, with 1.3x the potency of morphine, pyrrolidinylthiambutene is the least potent at 0.7x, and the rest are all around the same potency as morphine. Diethylthiambutene has been the most widely used, mainly in veterinary medicine.

All of these compounds produced anticholinergic and antihistamine side effects, except for two of the weaker compounds diallylthiambutene and morpholinylthiambutene. They also all have a chiral centre on the alpha carbon (where the R1 group is attached) and so have two stereoisomers, with the dextro isomer being the more potent in all cases, although both isomers are active.

Three of these compounds are explicitly listed as illegal drugs under UN convention, diethylthiambutene, dimethylthiambutene and ethylmethylthiambutene, and so are illegal throughout the world, but the rest will only be illegal in countries such as the US, Australia and New Zealand that have laws equivalent to the Federal Analog Act.

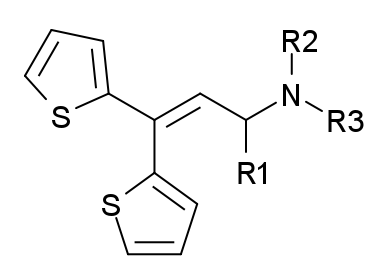

Drug name	R1	R2	R3	Analgesic Potency (Morphine = 1)
Ethylmethylthiambutene	methyl	ethyl	methyl	1.3
Dimethylthiambutene	methyl	methyl	methyl	1.0
Diethylthiambutene	methyl	ethyl	ethyl	1.0
Piperidylthiambutene	methyl	piperidyl	piperidyl	1.0
Pyrrolidinylthiambutene	methyl	pyrrolidinyl	pyrrolidinyl	0.7
Diallylthiambutene	methyl	allyl	allyl	0.5
Methylisopropylthiambutene	methyl	methyl	isopropyl	0.5
Morpholinylthiambutene	methyl	morpholinyl	morpholinyl	0.5
Methylpropylthiambutene	methyl	methyl	propyl	0.1
Diethyldesmethylthiambutene	hydrogen	ethyl	ethyl	0.2
Dipyrrolidinyldesmethylthiambutene	hydrogen	pyrrolidinyl	pyrrolidinyl	0.1
Dipiperidyldesmethylthiambutene	hydrogen	piperidyl	piperidyl	0.1
Dimethylphenylthiambutene	phenyl	methyl	methyl	0.1

Although not explicitly listed as opioids, Timepidium bromide & Tiquizium bromide share the same pharmacophore.
