= Dextrorphan =

Psychoactive cough suppressant medication

Clinical data
- Other names: DXO, Dextrorphanol
- Drug class: Cough suppressant; NMDA receptor antagonist; Serotonin-norepinephrine reuptake inhibitor; Dissociative hallucinogen
- ATC code: None

Legal status
- Legal status: US: Unscheduled

Identifiers
- IUPAC name: (+)-17-methyl-9a,13a,14a-morphinan-3-ol
- CAS Number: 125-73-5
- PubChem CID: 5360697
- ChemSpider: 10489895
- UNII: 04B7QNO9WS
- ChEMBL: ChEMBL1254766
- CompTox Dashboard (EPA): DTXSID301014178
- ECHA InfoCard: 100.004.323

Chemical and physical data
- Formula: C_{17}H_{23}NO
- Molar mass: 257.377 g·mol^{−1}
- 3D model (JSmol): Interactive image
- SMILES: CN1CC[C@@]23CCCC[C@@H]2[C@@H]1Cc4c3cc(O)cc4
- InChI: InChI=1S/C17H23NO/c1-18-9-8-17-7-3-2-4-14(17)16(18)10-12-5-6-13(19)11-15(12)17/h5-6,11,14,16,19H,2-4,7-10H2,1H3/t14-,16+,17+/m1/s1; Key:JAQUASYNZVUNQP-PVAVHDDUSA-N

Dextrorphan (DXO) is a psychoactive drug of the morphinan class which acts as an antitussive or cough suppressant and in high doses a dissociative hallucinogen. It is the dextrorotatory enantiomer of racemorphan; the levorotatory enantiomer is levorphanol. Dextrorphan is produced by O-demethylation of dextromethorphan by CYP2D6. Dextrorphan is an NMDA antagonist and contributes to the psychoactive effects of dextromethorphan.

== Pharmacology ==
=== Pharmacodynamics ===
Dextrorphan
Site	K_{i} (nM)	Species	Ref
NMDAR (MK-801)	486–906	Rat	
σ_{1}	118–481	Rat	
σ_{2}	11,325–15,582	Rat	
MOR	420 >1,000	Rat; Human	
DOR	34,700	Rat	
KOR	5,950	Rat	
SERT	401–484	Rat	
NET	≥340	Rat	
DAT	>1,000	Rat	
5-HT_{1A}	>1,000	Rat	
5-HT_{1B}_{/}_{1D}	54% at 1 μM	Rat	
5-HT_{2A}	>1,000	Rat	
α_{1}	>1,000	Rat	
α_{2}	>1,000	Rat	
β	35% at 1 μM	Rat	
D_{2}	>1,000	Rat	
H_{1}	95% at 1 μM	Rat	
mAChRs	100% at 1 μM	Rat	
nAChRs	1,300–29,600 (IC_{50})	Rat	
VDSCs	ND	ND	ND
Values are K_{i} (nM), unless otherwise noted. The smaller the value, the more strongly the drug binds to the site.

The pharmacology of dextrorphan is similar to that of dextromethorphan (DXM). However, dextrorphan is much more potent as an NMDA receptor antagonist and much less active as a serotonin reuptake inhibitor, but retains DXM's activity as a norepinephrine reuptake inhibitor. It also has more affinity for the opioid receptors than dextromethorphan, significantly so at high doses.

=== Pharmacokinetics ===
Dextrorphan has a notably longer elimination half-life than its parent compound, and therefore has a tendency to accumulate in the blood after repeated administration of normally dosed dextromethorphan formulations. It is further converted to 3-HM by CYP3A4 or glucuronidated.

== Society and culture ==
=== Legal status ===
Dextrorphan was formerly a Schedule I controlled substance in the United States, but was unscheduled on October 1, 1976.

== Research ==
Dextrorphan was under development for the treatment of stroke, and reached phase II clinical trials for this indication, but development was discontinued.

== Environmental presence ==
In 2021, dextrorphan was identified in >75% of sludge samples taken from 12 wastewater treatment plants in California. The same study associated dextrorphan with estrogenic activity by using predictive modelling, before observing it in in vitro.

== See also ==
- Cough syrup
- Racemorphan; Levorphanol
- Noscapine
- Codeine; Pholcodine
- Dextromethorphan; Dimemorfan
- Butamirate
- Pentoxyverine
- Tipepidine
- Cloperastine
