= Hydrobromide =

Type of compound

In chemistry, a hydrobromide is an acid salt resulting, or regarded as resulting, from the reaction of hydrobromic acid with an organic base (e.g. an amine). The compounds are similar to hydrochlorides.

Some drugs are formulated as hydrobromides, e.g. dextromethorphan hydrobromide.

== See also ==
- Bromide, inorganic salts of hydrobromic acid
- Bromine, the element Br
- Free base (chemistry)
