= Alternative treatments used for the common cold =

Overview of notable treatment methods used for the common cold in alternative medicine

Alternative treatments used for the common cold include numerous home remedies and alternative medicines. Scientific research regarding the efficacy of each treatment is generally nonexistent or inconclusive. Current best evidence indicates prevention, including hand washing and neatness, and management of symptoms.

== Echinacea ==
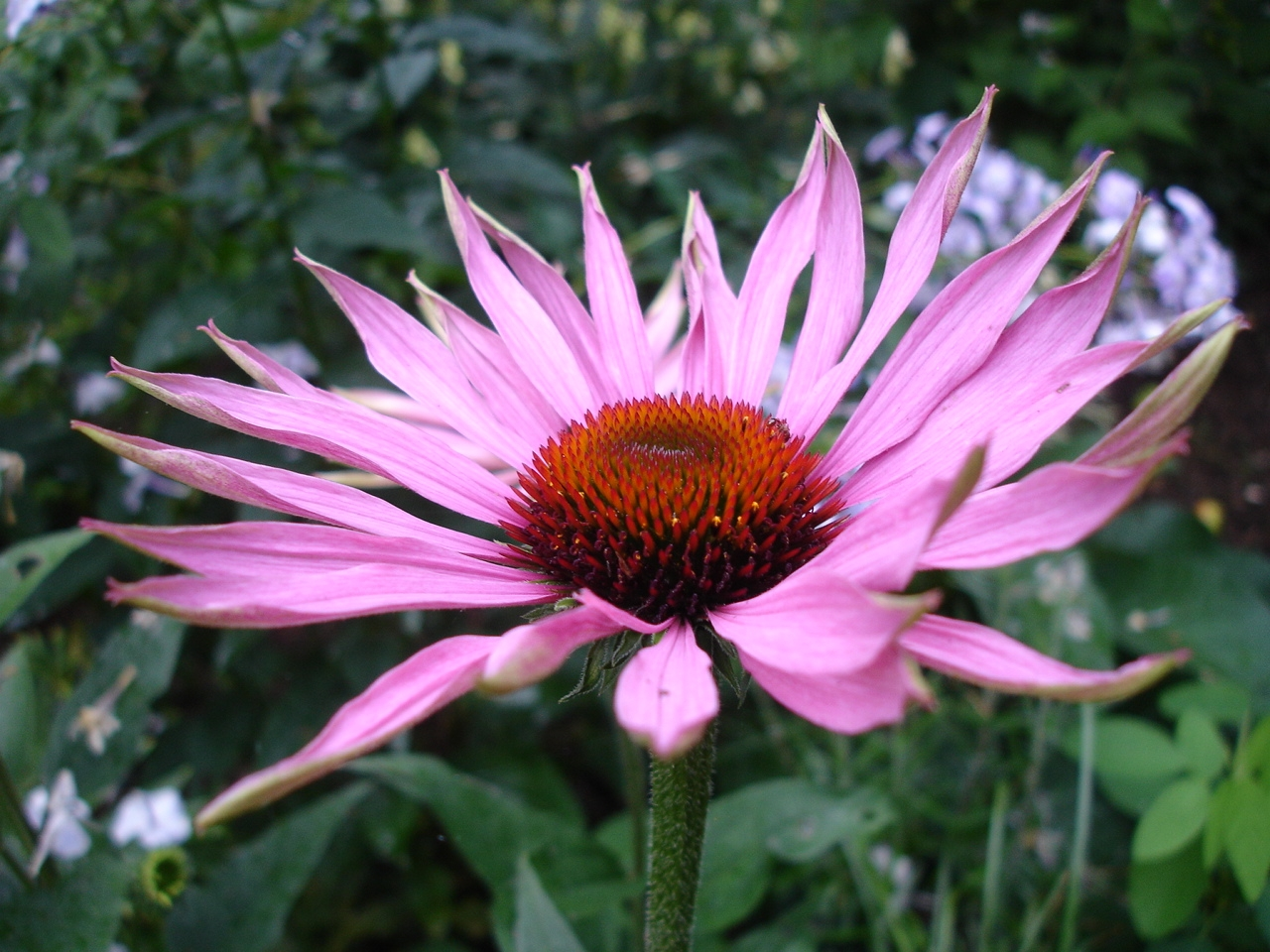
Echinacea flower

A systematic review by the Cochrane Collaboration, last updated in 2014, examines twenty-four randomized controlled trials studying various echinacea preparations for prevention and treatment of the common cold. Echinacea showed no benefit over placebo for prevention. Evidence for treatment was inconsistent. Reported side effects were rare.

2007 meta-analyses conclude that there is some evidence that echinacea may reduce either the duration or severity of the common cold, but results are not consistent.

Use of echinacea preparations is not currently recommended.

== Chicken soup ==
In the twelfth century, Moses Maimonides wrote, "Chicken soup ... is recommended as an excellent food as well as medication." Since then, there have been numerous reports in the United States that chicken soup alleviates the symptoms of the common cold. Even usually staid medical journals have published tongue-in-cheek articles on the alleged medicinal properties of chicken soup.

== Pelargonium sidoides extract ==
A 2013 Cochrane review found tentative evidence of benefit with Pelargonium sidoides for the symptoms of the common cold; however, the quality of the evidence was very poor.

== Steam inhalation ==
Many people believe that steam inhalation reduces cold symptoms. There is insufficient evidence to recommend routine usage of steam inhalation for treating the common cold. There have been reports of children being badly burned by accidentally spilling the water used for steam inhalation.

Evidence does not support a relationship between cold temperature exposure or a "chill" (feeling of coldness) and the common cold.
