= Tannate =

Class of chemical compounds

A tannate is the salt or ester of tannic acid.

In the context of pharmacology, chemical compounds or substances broadly fitting the definition of "medicine" or "drug" are paired with a tannate molecule to produce a specific form of substance. For example, Albumin tannate (also known as Tannin albuminate) is an antidiarrheal, commonly in the form of gelatin.
