= Timepidium bromide =

Chemical compound

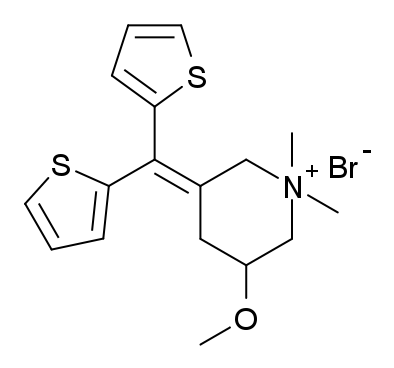

Clinical data
- AHFS/Drugs.com: International Drug Names
- Routes of administration: SC, IM, IV
- ATC code: A03AB19 (WHO)

Legal status
- Legal status: In general: ℞ (Prescription only)

Identifiers
- IUPAC name: 3-(di-2-thienylmethylene)-5-methoxy-1,1-dimethylpiperidinium bromide
- CAS Number: 35035-05-3
- PubChem CID: 160243
- ChemSpider: 140841
- UNII: 8R9E4766V4
- CompTox Dashboard (EPA): DTXSID4023672

Chemical and physical data
- Formula: C_{17}H_{22}BrNOS_{2}
- Molar mass: 400.39 g·mol^{−1}
- 3D model (JSmol): Interactive image
- SMILES: C[N+]1(CC(CC(=C(C2=CC=CS2)C3=CC=CS3)C1)OC)C.[Br-]
- InChI: InChI=1S/C17H22NOS2.BrH/c1-18(2)11-13(10-14(12-18)19-3)17(15-6-4-8-20-15)16-7-5-9-21-16;/h4-9,14H,10-12H2,1-3H3;1H/q+1;/p-1; Key:QTSXMEPZSHLZFF-UHFFFAOYSA-M

Timepidium bromide (INN) is an anticholinergic. It is used in the symptomatic treatment of visceral spasms. It is also used to relieve pain associated with various gastrointestinal disorders. The quaternary nitrogen prevents it from crossing the blood brain barrier, so it is peripherally acting with no central side effects.

The same compound sans the quaternary methyl group and the methoxy ether is called tipepidine.
