= Levorphanol =

Opioid analgesic drug

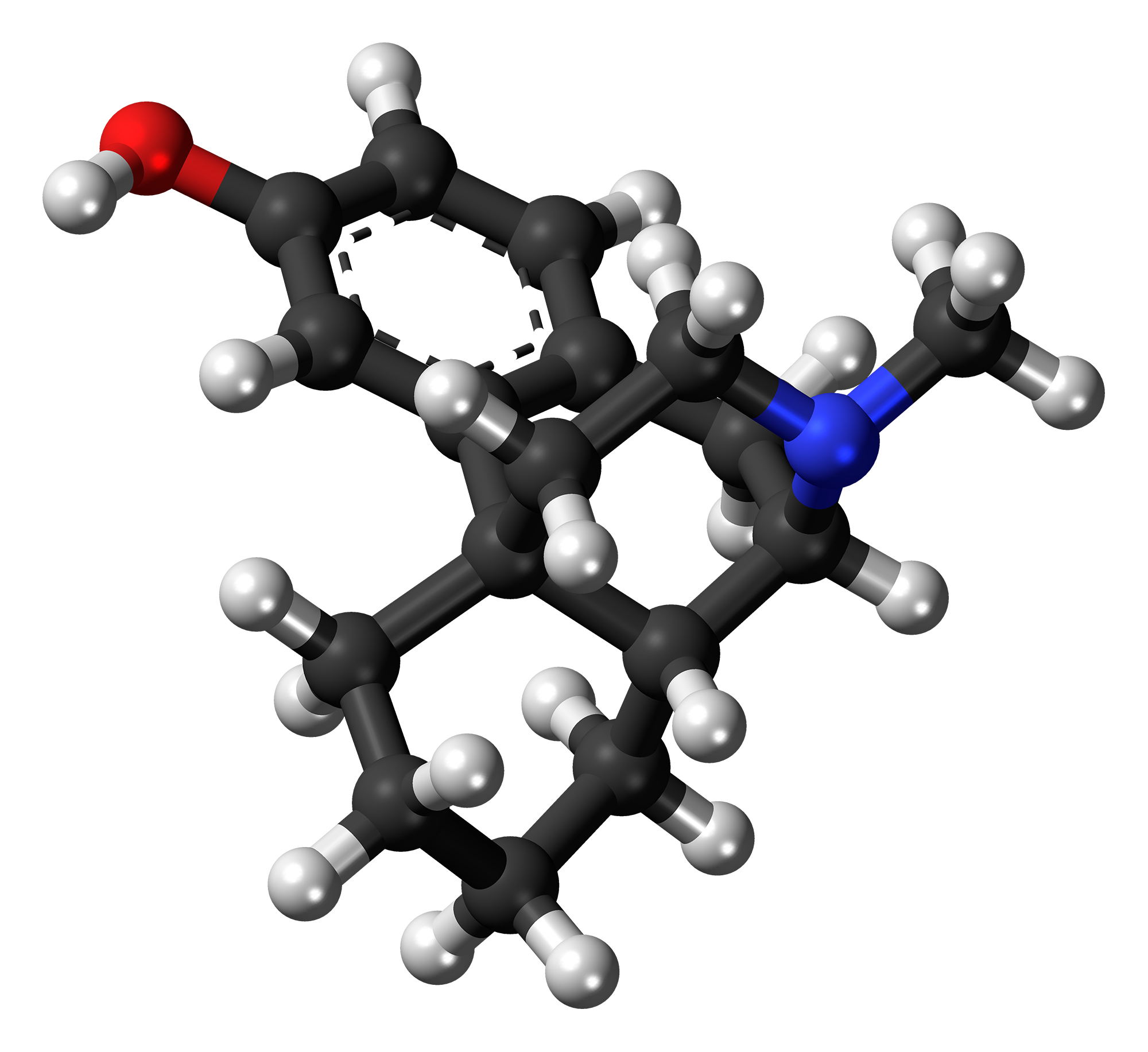

Clinical data
- Trade names: Levo-Dromoran
- Other names: Ro 1-5431
- AHFS/Drugs.com: Monograph
- MedlinePlus: a682020
- Routes of administration: Oral, intravenous, subcutaneous, intramuscular
- Drug class: Opioid
- ATC code: None

Legal status
- Legal status: AU: S8 (Controlled drug); BR: Class A1 (Narcotic drugs); CA: Schedule I; DE: Anlage II (Authorized trade only, not prescriptible); UK: Class A; US: Schedule II

Pharmacokinetic data
- Bioavailability: 70% (oral); 100% (IV)
- Protein binding: 40%
- Metabolism: Hepatic
- Elimination half-life: 11–16 hours

Identifiers
- IUPAC name: (1R,9R,10R)-17-Methyl-17-azatetracyclo[7.5.3.0^{1},^{10}.0^{2},^{7}]heptadeca-2(7),3,5-trien-4-ol
- CAS Number: 77-07-6
- PubChem CID: 5359272
- IUPHAR/BPS: 7595
- DrugBank: DB00854
- ChemSpider: 16736212
- UNII: 27618J1N2X
- KEGG: D08123
- ChEMBL: ChEMBL592
- CompTox Dashboard (EPA): DTXSID3023213
- ECHA InfoCard: 100.000.912

Chemical and physical data
- Formula: C_{17}H_{23}NO
- Molar mass: 257.377 g·mol^{−1}
- 3D model (JSmol): Interactive image
- SMILES: CN1CC[C@]23CCCC[C@H]2[C@H]1Cc4c3cc(O)cc4
- InChI: InChI=1S/C17H23NO/c1-18-9-8-17-7-3-2-4-14(17)16(18)10-12-5-6-13(19)11-15(12)17/h5-6,11,14,16,19H,2-4,7-10H2,1H3/t14-,16+,17+/m0/s1; Key:JAQUASYNZVUNQP-USXIJHARSA-N

Levorphanol, sold under the brand name Levo-Dromoran, is an opioid medication used to treat moderate to severe pain. It is the levorotatory enantiomer of the compound racemorphan. Its dextrorotatory counterpart is dextrorphan.

It was first described in Germany in 1946. The drug has been in medical use in the United States since 1953.

== Pharmacology ==
Levorphanol acts predominantly as an agonist of the μ-opioid receptor (MOR), but is also an agonist of the δ-opioid receptor (DOR), κ-opioid receptor (KOR), and the nociceptin receptor (NOP), as well as an NMDA receptor antagonist and a serotonin-norepinephrine reuptake inhibitor (SNRI). Levorphanol, similarly to certain other opioids, also acts as a glycine receptor antagonist and GABA receptor antagonist at very high concentrations. As per the World Health Organization, levorphanol is a step 3 opioid and is considered eight times more potent than morphine at the MOR (2 mg levorphanol is equivalent to 15 mg morphine).

Relative to morphine, levorphanol lacks complete cross-tolerance and possesses greater intrinsic activity at the MOR. The duration of action is generally long compared to other comparable analgesics and varies from 4 hours to as much as 15 hours. For this reason levorphanol is useful in palliation of chronic pain and similar conditions. Levorphanol has an oral to parenteral effectiveness ratio of 2:1, one of the most favorable of the strong narcotics. Its antagonism of the NMDA receptor, similar to those of the phenylheptylamine open-chain opioids such as methadone or the phenylpiperidine ketobemidone, make levorphanol useful for types of pain that other analgesics may not be as effective against, such as neuropathic pain. Levorphanol's exceptionally high analgesic efficacy in the treatment of neuropathic pain is also conferred by its action on serotonin and norepinephrine transporters, similar to the opioids tramadol and tapentadol, and mutually complements the analgesic effect of its NMDA receptor antagonism.

Levorphanol shows a high rate of psychotomimetic side effects such as hallucinations and delirium, which have been attributed to its binding to and activation of the KOR. At the same time however, activation of this receptor as well as of the DOR have been determined to contribute to its analgesic effects.

== Chemistry ==
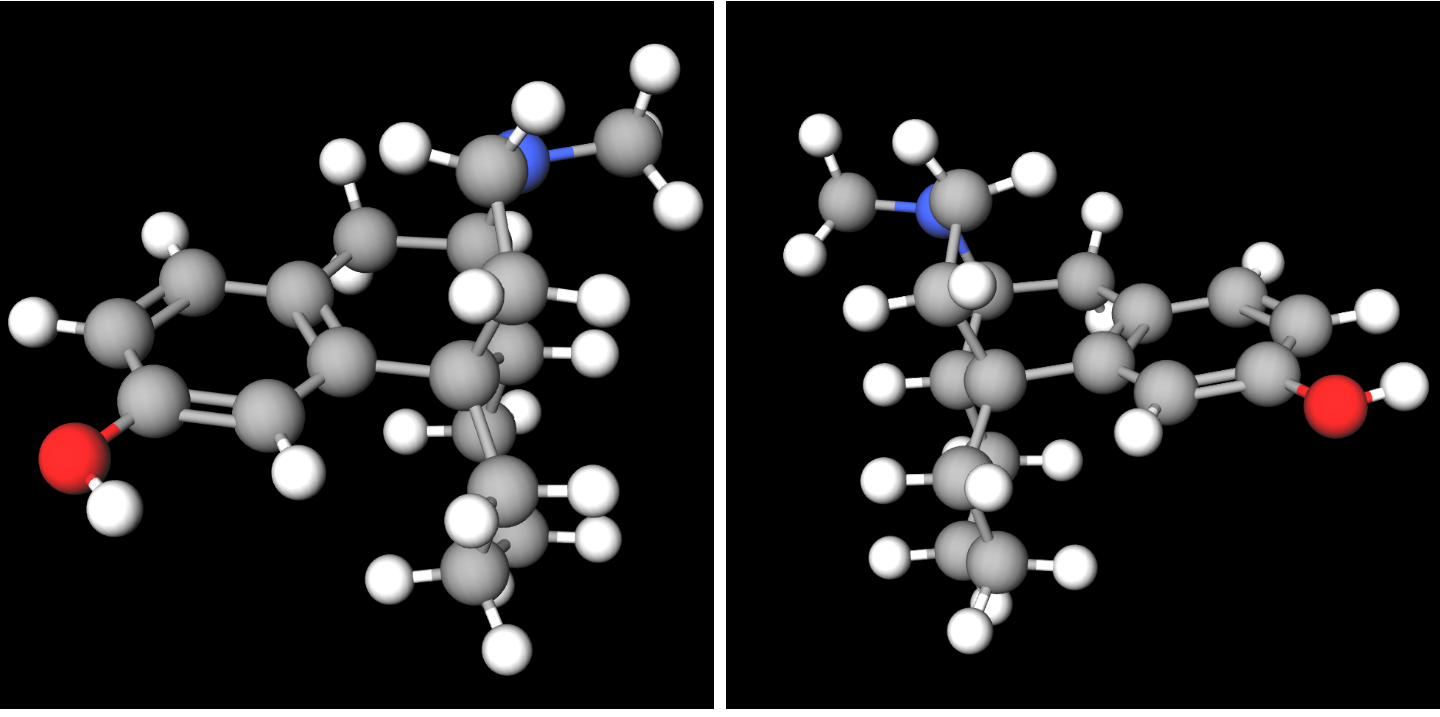
Levorphanol and its stereoisomer dextrorphan, the enantiomers of the racemic mixture racemorphan.

Chemically, levorphanol belongs to the morphinan class and is (−)-3-hydroxy-N-methyl-morphinan. It is the "left-handed" (levorotatory) stereoisomer of racemorphan, the racemic mixture of the two stereoisomers with differing pharmacology. The "right-handed" (dextrorotatory) enantiomer of racemorphan is dextrorphan (DXO), an antitussive, potent dissociative hallucinogen (NMDA receptor antagonist), and weakly active opioid. DXO is an active metabolite of the pharmaceutical drug dextromethorphan (DXM), which, analogously to DXO, is an enantiomer of the racemic mixture racemethorphan along with levomethorphan, the latter of which has similar properties to those of levorphanol.

== Society and culture ==
=== Name ===
Levorphanol is the INN, BAN, and DCF. As the medically used tartrate salt, the drug is also known as levorphanol tartrate (USAN, BANM). The former developmental code name of levorphanol at Roche was Ro 1-5431.

=== Availability ===
As the tartrate salt, levorphanol is marketed by Hikma Pharmaceuticals USA Inc. and Virtus Pharmaceuticals in the U.S., and Canada under the brand name Levo-Dromoran.

=== Legality ===
Levorphanol is listed under the Single Convention On Narcotic Drugs 1961 and is regulated like morphine in most countries. In the U.S., it is a Schedule II Narcotic controlled substance with a DEA ACSCN of 9220 and 2013 annual aggregate manufacturing quota of 4.5 kilograms. The salts in use are the tartrate (free base conversion ratio 0.58) and hydrobromide (0.76).
