= Cold medicine =

Medication taken to relieve cold symptoms

Cough medicine
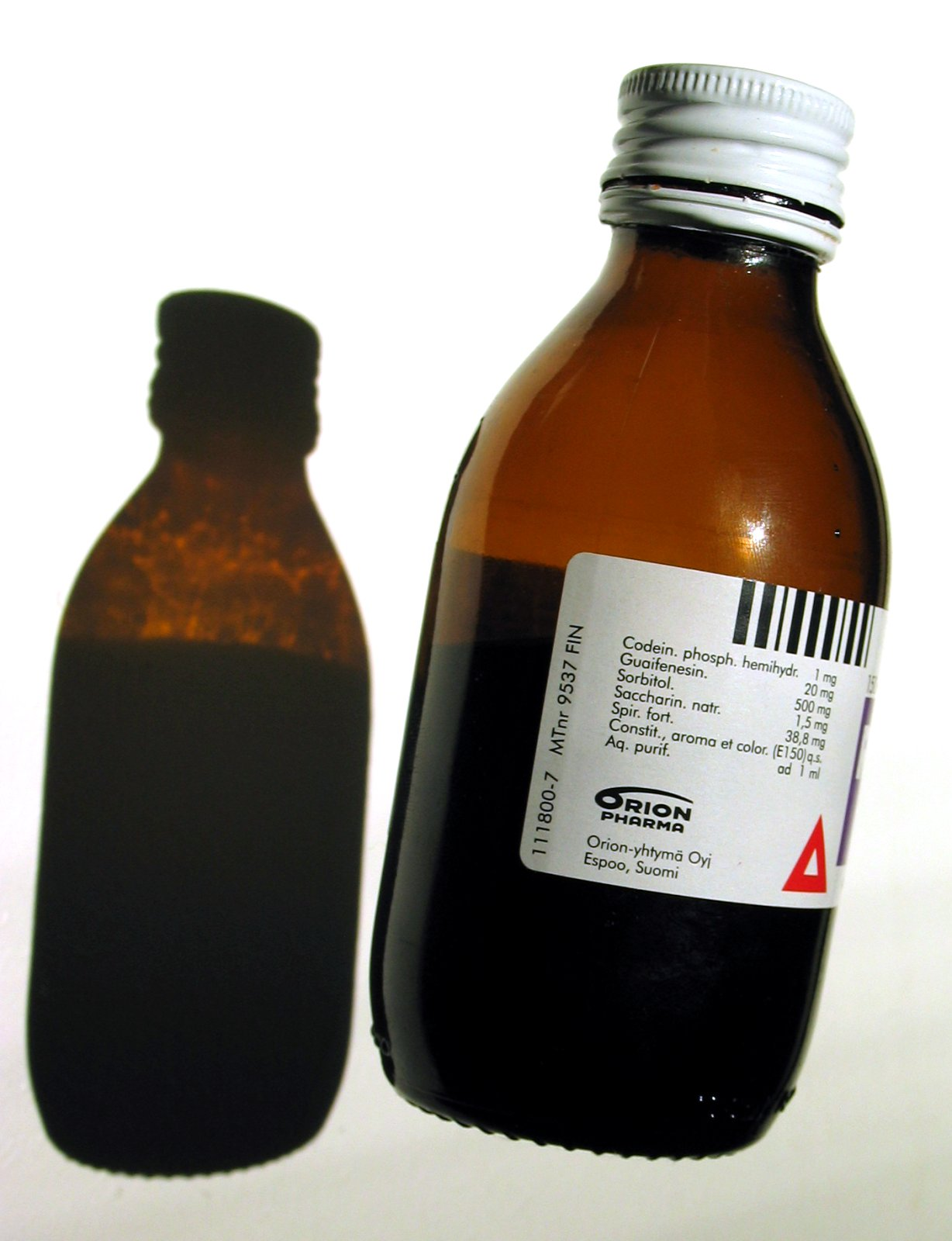
- Cough medicine often contains cough suppressants and expectorants.
- Other names: Cough and cold medicine, cough syrup, lin, lean

Cold medicines are a group of medications taken individually or in combination as a treatment for the symptoms of the common cold and similar conditions of the upper respiratory tract. The term encompasses a broad array of drugs, including analgesics, antihistamines and decongestants, among many others. It also includes drugs which are marketed as cough suppressants or antitussives, but their effectiveness in reducing cough symptoms is unclear or minimal.

While they have been used by 10% of American children in any given week, they are not recommended in Canada or the United States in children six years or younger because of lack of evidence showing effect and concerns of harm.

== Types ==
There are a number of different cough and cold medications, which may be used for various coughing symptoms. The commercially available products may include various combinations of any one or more of the following types of substances:

- Mucokinetics, or mucolytics, are a class of drugs which aid in the clearance of mucus from the airways, lungs, bronchi, and trachea. Examples are carbocisteine, ambroxol, and bromhexine.
- Expectorants are substances claimed to make coughing easier by modifying the production of mucus. Two examples are acetylcysteine and guaifenesin.
- Antitussives, or cough suppressants, are substances which suppress the coughing itself. Examples are dextromethorphan, benzonatate, codeine, hydrocodone, pholcodine, noscapine, cloperastine, and butamirate.
- Antihistamines, for allergic rhinitis, may produce mild sedation and reduce other associated symptoms, like a runny nose and watery eyes. Examples are diphenhydramine, chlorpheniramine, brompheniramine, loratadine, and cetirizine.
- Decongestants may improve nasal congestion in sinus infections. Examples are ephedrine, phenylephrine, pseudoephedrine, and oxymetazoline.
- Fever or pain medication. Examples are paracetamol (acetaminophen) and NSAIDs such as ibuprofen or naproxen.
- Also employed are various substances supposed to soften the coughing, like honey or supplement syrup.

An example combination is guaifenesin with codeine.

== Effectiveness ==
The efficacy of cough medication is questionable, particularly in children. A 2014 Cochrane review concluded that "There is no good evidence for or against the effectiveness of OTC [over the counter] medicines in acute cough". Some cough medicines may be no more effective than placebos for acute coughs in adults, including coughs related to upper respiratory tract infections. The American College of Chest Physicians emphasizes that cough medicines are not designed to treat whooping cough, a cough that is caused by bacteria and can last for months. No over-the-counter cough medicines have been found to be effective in cases of pneumonia. They are not recommended in those who have COPD, chronic bronchitis, or the common cold. There is not enough evidence to make recommendations for those who have a cough in cancer.

=== Medications ===
- Dextromethorphan (DXM) may be modestly effective in decreasing cough in adults with viral upper respiratory infections. However, in children, it has not been found to be effective.
- Codeine was once viewed as the "gold standard" in cough suppressants, but this position is now questioned. Some placebo-controlled trials have found that it is ineffective against some forms of cough, including acute cough in children. It is thus not recommended for children. Additionally, there is no evidence that hydrocodone is useful in children. Similarly, a 2012 Dutch guideline does not recommend its use to treat acute cough.

A number of other commercially available cough treatments have not been shown to be effective in viral upper respiratory infections. These include for adults: antihistamines, antihistamine-decongestant combinations, benzonatate, anti asthmatic-expectorant-mucolytic combinations, expectorant-bronchodilator combinations, leukotriene inhibitors, ambroxol, and guaifenesin, sometimes with analgesics, antipyretics, anti inflammatories, and anticholinergics; and for children: antihistamines, decongestants for clearing the nose, or combinations of these and leukotriene inhibitors for allergy and asthma. However, antihistamines cannot be used as an empirical therapy in case of chronic, or non-specific cough, especially in very young children. Long term diphenhydramine use is associated with negative outcomes in older people.

=== Alternative medicine ===
A small study found honey may be a minimally effective cough treatment due to "well-established antioxidant and antimicrobial effects" and a tendency to soothe irritated tissue. A Cochrane review found there was weak evidence to recommend for or against the use of honey in children as a cough remedy. In light of these findings, the Cochrane study found honey was better than no treatment, placebo, or diphenhydramine but not better than dextromethorphan for relieving cough symptoms. Honey's use as a cough treatment has been linked on several occasions to infantile botulism and accordingly should not be used in children less than one year old.

Many alternative treatments are used to treat the common cold, though data on effectiveness is generally limited. A 2007 review states that, "alternative therapies (i.e., Echinacea, vitamin C, and zinc) are not recommended for treating common cold symptoms; however, Vitamin C prophylaxis may modestly reduce the duration and severity of the common cold in the general population and may reduce the incidence of the illness in persons exposed to physical and environmental stresses." A 2014 review also found insufficient evidence for Echinacea, where no clinical relevance was proven to provide benefit for treating the common cold, despite a weak benefit for positive trends. Similarly, a 2014 systematic review showed that garlic may prevent occurrences of the common cold but there was insufficient evidence of garlic in treating the common cold and studies reported adverse effects of a rash and odour. Therefore, more research needs to be done to prove that the benefits outweigh the harms.

Evidence supporting the effectiveness of zinc is mixed with respect to cough. A 2003 review concluded: "Clinical trial data support the value of zinc in reducing the duration and severity of symptoms of the common cold when administered within 24 hours of the onset of common cold symptoms." Zinc gel in the nose may lead to long-term or permanent loss of smell. The FDA therefore discourages its use.

=== Recreational usage ===
Cough medicines, especially those containing dextromethorphan and codeine, are often abused as recreational drugs. Abuse may result in hallucinations, loss of consciousness and death. Many cough syrups can contain acetaminophen which will cause liver damage in recreational users.

== Adverse effects ==
A number of accidental overdoses and well-documented adverse effects suggested caution in children. The FDA in 2015 warned that the use of codeine-containing cough medication in children may cause breathing problems. Cold syrup overdose has been linked to visual and auditory hallucinations as well as rapid involuntary jaw, tongue, and eye movements in children.

Decongestants are possibly harmful to people with high blood pressure or a heart disease because these substances can constrict the blood vessels.

== History ==
Heroin was originally marketed as a cough suppressant in 1898. It was, at the time, believed to be a non-addictive alternative to other opiate-containing cough syrups. This was quickly realized not to be true as heroin readily breaks down into morphine in the body. Morphine was already known to be addictive.

== Society and culture ==
=== Brands ===
Some brand names include: Benylin, Sudafed, Robitussin and Vicks among others. Most contain a number of active ingredients.

There are a number of throat lozenge brands. The Thai company Hatakabb produces the Takabb Anti-Cough Pill, which is a Chinese herbal medication.

Sudafed is a brand owned by Kenvue. Sudafed markets a variety of nasal decongestant products with different active ingredients in different countries. The original formulation contains the active ingredient pseudoephedrine. Other Sudafed-branded products contain phenylephrine, oxymetazoline, xylometazoline, antihistamines, pain relievers, and other active ingredients. Product names and formulations vary by country. Restrictions on the sale of pseudoephedrine in the many countries has led to changes in which products are available over the counter without authorization from a pharmacist or prescriber. In 2016, Sudafed was one of the biggest selling branded over-the-counter medications sold in Great Britain, with sales of £34.4 million.

Gee's Linctus is a cough medicine which contains opium tincture. New Zealand in 2019 moved it to prescription only.

Coricidin, Coricidin D, or Coricidin HBP, is the brand name of a combination of dextromethorphan and chlorpheniramine maleate (an antihistamine). Varieties may also contain acetaminophen and guaifenesin.

Codral is a brand name manufactured by Johnson & Johnson and sold primarily in Australia and New Zealand. Codral is the highest-selling cold and flu medication in Australia.

=== Economics ===
In the United States, several billion dollars are spent on over-the-counter products per year.

=== Poisoning ===
According to The New York Times, at least eight mass poisonings have occurred as a result of counterfeit cough syrup in which medical-grade glycerin has been replaced with diethylene glycol, an inexpensive, yet toxic, glycerin substitute marketed for industrial use. In May 2007, 365 deaths were reported in Panama, which were associated with cough syrup containing diethylene glycol. In 2022, the deaths of 66 children in The Gambia were linked to four pediatric cough syrup medications that contained diethylene glycol and ethylene glycol.

In 2022, the US Food and Drug Administration issued a warning against cooking foods in cough syrup after a video of someone preparing "NyQuil chicken", sometimes also called "sleepy chicken", became popular on social media. Cough syrup is designed to be stored at room temperature and its properties can change when it is heated, making it potentially deadly. Heated cough syrup can also vaporize, leading to inhalation hazards. The warning received attention from many news outlets, but some criticized the FDA's handling of the issue for amplifying the attention the topic received online and questioned if making and eating NyQuil chicken actually existed as a widespread trend.

== See also ==
- Cough drop
