= Pholcodine =

Chemical compound

Clinical data
- Trade names: Logicin, others
- AHFS/Drugs.com: International Drug Names
- Addiction liability: High
- Routes of administration: By mouth
- ATC code: R05DA08 (WHO)

Legal status
- Legal status: BR: Class A2 (Narcotic drugs); CA: Schedule I; DE: Anlage II (Authorized trade only, not prescriptible); UK: Class B; US: Schedule I

Pharmacokinetic data
- Bioavailability: Maximum plasma conc. attained 4-8 hours after oral dose.
- Protein binding: 23.5%
- Metabolism: Liver
- Elimination half-life: 32-43 hours; volume of distribution is 36-49L/kg.
- Excretion: Kidney

Identifiers
- IUPAC name: 7,8-Didehydro-4,5α-epoxy-17-methyl-3-[2-(morpholin-4-yl)ethoxy]morphinan-6α-ol
- CAS Number: 509-67-1
- PubChem CID: 5311356
- DrugBank: DB09209
- ChemSpider: 4470854
- UNII: LPP64AWZ7L
- KEGG: D07385
- ChEBI: CHEBI:53579
- ChEMBL: ChEMBL2105224
- CompTox Dashboard (EPA): DTXSID70198923
- ECHA InfoCard: 100.007.367

Chemical and physical data
- Formula: C_{23}H_{30}N_{2}O_{4}
- Molar mass: 398.503 g·mol^{−1}
- 3D model (JSmol): Interactive image
- SMILES: O(c5ccc4c1c5O[C@H]3[C@@H](O)\C=C/[C@H]2[C@H](N(C)CC[C@@]123)C4)CCN6CCOCC6
- InChI: InChI=1S/C23H30N2O4/c1-24-7-6-23-16-3-4-18(26)22(23)29-21-19(5-2-15(20(21)23)14-17(16)24)28-13-10-25-8-11-27-12-9-25/h2-5,16-18,22,26H,6-14H2,1H3/t16-,17+,18-,22-,23-/m0/s1; Key:GPFAJKDEDBRFOS-FKQDBXSBSA-N

Pholcodine is an opioid cough suppressant (antitussive). It helps suppress unproductive coughs and also has a mild sedative effect, but has little or no analgesic effects. It is also known as morpholinylethylmorphine and homocodeine.

Pholcodine is found in certain cough lozenges, and more commonly as an oral solution, typically 5 mg / 5 ml. Adult dosage is 5-10 ml up to 3-4 times daily. Pholcodine now largely replaces the previously more common codeine linctus, as it has a much lower potential for dependence.

Pholcodine has been widely used as an antitussive agent but by 2023 concerns over its association with anaphylaxis in some circumstances meant that it has been withdrawn from sale in many territories. Pholcodine is not prescribed in the United States where it is classed as a Schedule I drug, the most highly controlled drug category.

Following the conclusion of a review of post-marketing safety data by the Medicines and Healthcare products Regulatory Agency, all pholcodine-containing medicines were recalled and withdrawn from the UK as a precaution. The available data has demonstrated that pholcodine use, particularly in the twelve months before general anesthesia with NMBAs (neuromuscular blocking agents), is a risk factor for developing an anaphylactic reaction to NMBAs. In December 2022, the European Medicines Agency recommended their withdrawal in the EU. As of February 2023, the Australian Therapeutic Goods Administration canceled the registration of pholcodine.

== Mechanism of action ==
Pholcodine is readily absorbed from the gastrointestinal tract and freely crosses the blood–brain barrier. It acts primarily on the central nervous system (CNS), causing depression of the cough reflex, partly by a direct effect on the cough centre in the medulla. It is metabolized in the liver and its action may be prolonged in individuals with hepatic insufficiency (i.e. liver problems). Its use is therefore contraindicated in patients with liver disease, while care is advised in patients with hepatic impairment.

== Metabolism and excretion ==
Pholcodine is slowly biotransformed in the body via oxidation and conjugation to a series of metabolites that are eliminated primarily in the urine. With an average half-life of approximately 2.3 days, steady-state in someone taking the drug chronically would not be reached for nearly 2 weeks. Nearly one-half of a single dose is eventually excreted as free or conjugated parent drug. The most important urinary metabolite is conjugated morphine, which may be detectable for days or weeks after the last dose. This could trigger a positive result for opiates in a urine drug testing program.

== Side effects ==
Side effects are rare and may include dizziness and gastrointestinal disturbances such as nausea or vomiting. Adverse effects such as constipation, drowsiness, excitation, ataxia and respiratory depression have been reported occasionally or after large doses. The primary safety concerns with pholcodine revolve around death during general anaesthesia.

== Anaphylaxis during general anaesthesia ==
Administration of pholcodine causes production of antibodies linked with fatalities during surgery, when essential neuromuscular blocking agents (NMBAs) are administered to prevent patient movement under general anaesthesia. These antibody levels gradually fall to low levels several years after last dose of pholcodine. However, the presence of these antibodies causes a 300-fold increase in risk of anaphylaxis during anaesthesia.

The link was suspected when neighbouring Norway and Sweden were found to have tenfold differences of surgical anaphylaxis deaths. Sweden had no products approved containing pholcodine, whereas 40% of the population in Norway had consumed the single approved pholcodine product. Norway withdrew pholcodine from the market in 2007, and the prevalence of anti-suxamethonium antibodies fell by over 80% in two years. A corresponding fall in anaesthesia deaths followed.

A similar disparity exists between NMBA anaphylaxis rates in Australia, where pholcodine consumption is high and the US, where pholcodine is banned. In the US, anaphylaxis rates are so low that some anaesthetists question the existence of such reactions to NMBAs. Conversely, Australian anaesthetists have requested a ban on pholcodine due to the high anaphylaxis rate in the country. However, the Therapeutic Goods Administration declined the request in January 2015, pending further reviews to follow. In February 2023, the Therapeutic Goods Administration reversed its previous decision and banned products containing pholcodine.

In contrast, the European Medicines Agency's 2012 "Assessment report for Pholcodine containing medicinal products" concludes this: The Committee considered that evidence of an association between pholcodine use and development of NMBA-related anaphylaxis is circumstantial, not entirely consistent and therefore does not support the conclusion that there is a significant risk of cross-sensitisation to NMBAs and subsequent development of anaphylaxis during surgery.

In September 2022, the European Medicines Agency (EMA) started reviewing its position at the request of the French ANSM, which withdrew all pholcodine-containing medicines after preliminary results from a local study showed an increased risk of anaphylaxis after pholcodine use. The EMA review concluded on 14 December 2022 with the recommendation that pholcodine be withdrawn from the EU market. This decision was ratified by the European Commission in March 2023. The UK government recalled all products containing pholcodine in March 2023.
