= C10H18O2 =

The molecular formula C_{10}H_{18}O_{2} may refer to:

- Decalactones
  - δ-Decalactone
  - γ-Decalactone
- cis-2-Decenoic acid
- 8-Hydroxygeraniol
- Multistriatin
- Obtusilic acid
- 1-Octen-3-yl acetate
- Sobrerol
