= C13H20N2O2 =

The molecular formula C_{13}H_{20}N_{2}O_{2} (molar mass: 236.31 g/mol, exact mass: 236.1525 u) may refer to:

- Dropropizine, a cough suppressant
- Levodropropizine
- Metabutethamine
- Procaine
