= C14H19N3O =

The molecular formula C_{14}H_{19}N_{3}O (molar mass: 245.320 g/mol, exact mass: 245.1528 u) may refer to:

- Methafurylene, an antihistamine
- Oxolamine, a cough suppressant
