= Fedrilate =

Chemical compound

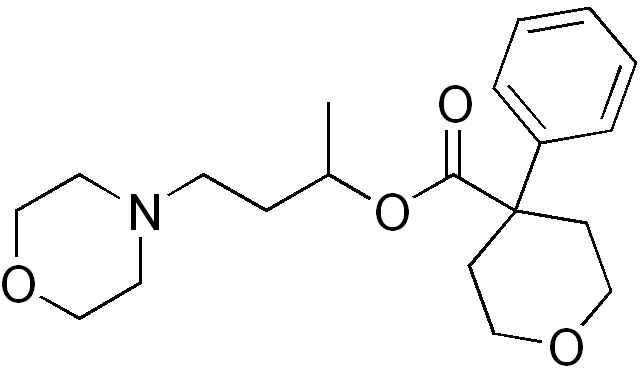

Clinical data
- Trade names: Tussefan
- ATC code: R05DB14 (WHO)

Identifiers
- IUPAC name: 4-morpholin-4-ylbutan-2-yl 4-phenyloxane-4-carboxylate
- CAS Number: 23271-74-1
- PubChem CID: 31796
- ChemSpider: 29485
- UNII: NT86R8M7J5
- KEGG: D07389
- ChEMBL: ChEMBL2104591
- CompTox Dashboard (EPA): DTXSID70865087
- ECHA InfoCard: 100.041.390

Chemical and physical data
- Formula: C_{20}H_{29}NO_{4}
- Molar mass: 347.455 g·mol^{−1}
- 3D model (JSmol): Interactive image
- SMILES: O=C(OC(CCN1CCOCC1)C)C3(c2ccccc2)CCOCC3
- InChI: InChI=1S/C20H29NO4/c1-17(7-10-21-11-15-24-16-12-21)25-19(22)20(8-13-23-14-9-20)18-5-3-2-4-6-18/h2-6,17H,7-16H2,1H3; Key:RDEOYUSTRWNWLX-UHFFFAOYSA-N

Fedrilate is a centrally acting cough suppressant. It was patented as a mucolytic by UCB in 1971, but was never brought to market in the US. In the Netherlands, it has been marketed as Tussefan and in combination with guaifenesin as Tussefan expectorans.
