= Decalactone =

Decalactone may refer to:

- δ-Decalactone (DDL)
- γ-Decalactone
