= Dibunate =

Chemical compound

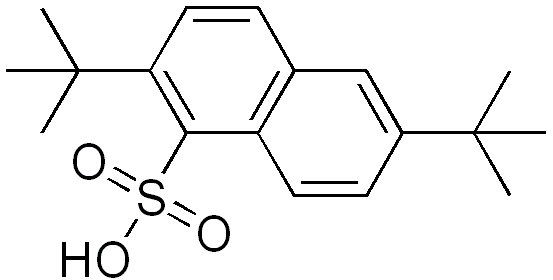

Clinical data
- Trade names: Aducin, Becantal, Becantex, Bechisan, Bexedyl, Keuten, Linctussal, Pectoro
- ATC code: R05DB16 (WHO)

Identifiers
- IUPAC name: 2,6-Di-tert-butylnaphthalene-1-sulfonic acid
- CAS Number: 14992-58-6
- PubChem CID: 84746
- DrugBank: DB13796
- ChemSpider: 76450
- UNII: ZXY319VL5S
- KEGG: D01700
- ChEBI: CHEBI:145567
- ChEMBL: ChEMBL1865134
- CompTox Dashboard (EPA): DTXSID7048245
- ECHA InfoCard: 100.035.511

Chemical and physical data
- Formula: C_{18}H_{24}O_{3}S
- Molar mass: 320.45 g·mol^{−1}
- 3D model (JSmol): Interactive image
- SMILES: O=S(=O)(O)c1c2c(ccc1C(C)(C)C)cc(cc2)C(C)(C)C
- InChI: InChI=1S/C18H24O3S/c1-17(2,3)13-8-9-14-12(11-13)7-10-15(18(4,5)6)16(14)22(19,20)21/h7-11H,1-6H3,(H,19,20,21); Key:WBEBQCINXJDZCX-UHFFFAOYSA-N

Dibunate is a cough suppressant. As the sodium salt, it has been marketed under the name Becantyl (in the United Kingdom), Becantex (in continental Europe), or Linctussal with a dosage of 20 to 30 mg, as either syrup or tablets.

Similar to benzonatate, it is a peripherally acting drug. It has not been reported to cause sedation, euphoria, habituation, or respiratory depression, unlike narcotic antitussives such as codeine. It may work by blocking afferent signals in the reflex arc which controls cough. Nausea is rarely seen as an adverse effect.
