= Terpin =

Chemical compound

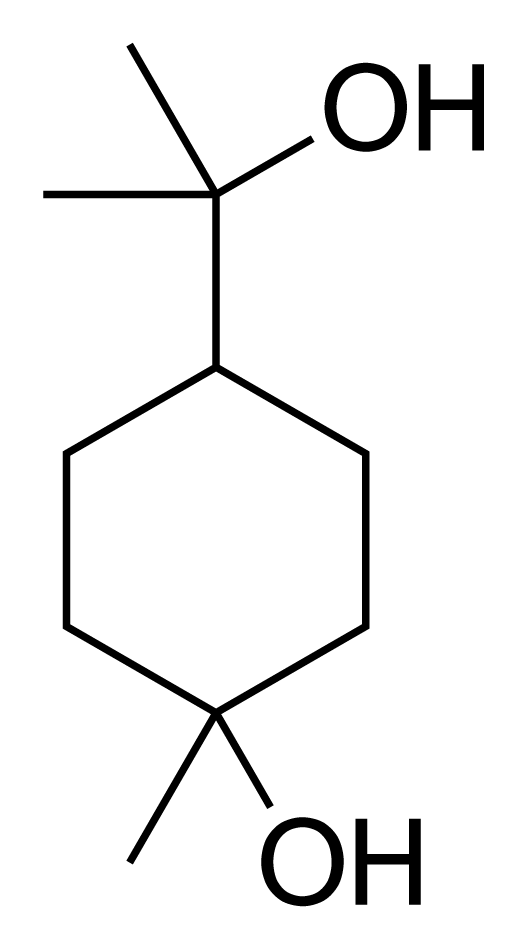

Clinical data
- Other names: Dipenteneglycol, p-menthane-1,8-diol
- ATC code: None

Identifiers
- IUPAC name: 4-(2-Hydroxypropan-2-yl)-1-methylcyclohexan-1-ol
- CAS Number: 565-48-0
- PubChem CID: 6651
- ChemSpider: 6399
- UNII: MPF495B08R
- ChEMBL: ChEMBL1651998
- CompTox Dashboard (EPA): DTXSID7023643

Chemical and physical data
- Formula: C_{10}H_{20}O_{2}
- Molar mass: 172.268 g·mol^{−1}
- 3D model (JSmol): Interactive image
- SMILES: CC1(CCC(CC1)C(C)(C)O)O
- InChI: InChI=1S/C10H20O2/c1-9(2,11)8-4-6-10(3,12)7-5-8/h8,11-12H,4-7H2,1-3H3; Key:RBNWAMSGVWEHFP-UHFFFAOYSA-N

Terpin is an expectorant, used to loosen mucus in patients with bronchitis and related conditions. It is used as the hydrate (terpin·H_{2}O). It is derived from sources such as turpentine, oregano, thyme, and eucalyptus. It was used in the United States in the late nineteenth century, but was removed from marketed medications in the 1990s after the Food and Drug Administration (FDA) found a lack of evidence of safety and effectiveness. Elixirs of terpin hydrate are still available with a prescription, but must be prepared by a compounding pharmacy.

It can be prepared from other volatile oils like geraniol and linalool by adding dilute acids (5% sulfuric acid) to them.

== Medical uses ==
Terpin hydrate is an expectorant, used in the treatment of acute and chronic bronchitis, pneumonia, bronchiectasis, chronic obstructive pulmonary disease, and infectious and inflammatory diseases of the upper respiratory tract. It is typically formulated with an antitussive, such as codeine, as a combined preparation.

== Adverse effects ==
Adverse reactions include depression of the respiration, sedation, coordination disorders, constipation, and urinary retention.

Long-term administration of the combination product of terpin hydrate with codeine may lead to codeine dependence. Terpin hydrate with codeine is often mixed with alcohol as codeine is not as readily as soluble in water. The high alcohol content (42 percent) may increase depression of the central nervous system, codeine metabolism, as well as abuse potential.

== Mechanism of action ==
A humectant and expectorant, terpin hydrate works directly on the bronchial secretory cells in the lower respiratory tract to liquify and facilitate the elimination of bronchial secretions. It also exerts a weak antiseptic effect on the pulmonary parenchyma.

== History ==
Terpin hydrate was first physiologically investigated by Lépine in 1855. He reported that it acted upon the mucous membranes and also the nervous system in a manner similar to the oil of turpentine.

The following preparations of terpin hydrate were available in the United States in 1907:

- Elixir of terpin hydrate
- Elixir of terpin hydrate with codeine
- Elixir of terpin hydrate with heroin

== Currently available expectorants in the United States ==
Currently, guaifenesin (glyceryl guaiacolate) is the only FDA approved expectorant in the United States. Besides terpin hydrate, other expectorants lacking evidence of efficacy include ammonium chloride, beechwood creosote, benzoin preparations, camphor, eucalyptol/eucalyptus oil, iodines, ipecac syrup, menthol/peppermint oil, pine tar preparations, potassium guaiacolsulfonate, sodium citrate, squill preparations, tolu balsam and turpentine.
