= Rockin' Dave Allen =

American blues guitarist, singer and songwriter

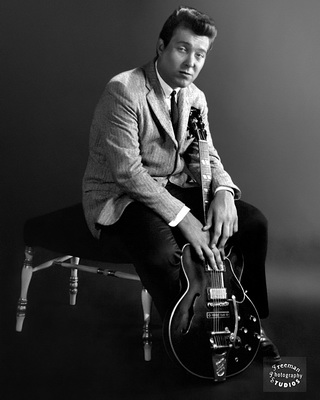

Background information
- Birth name: David Allen Stich
- Also known as: Dave Allen, Rockin' Dave Allen, Dave "The Man" Allen
- Born: September 27, 1941
- Origin: Houston, Texas, United States
- Died: April 28, 1985 (aged 43)
- Genres: Blues, swamp pop
- Instrument: Guitar
- Years active: 1957–1985
- Website: www.daveallenblues.com

David Allen Stich (September 27, 1941 – April 28, 1985), also known as Rockin' Dave Allen and Dave Allen, was an American blues guitarist, singer and songwriter. Allen performed live throughout Texas and the Gulf Coast area from the late 1950s through the early 1980s. He recorded for the Jin, Eric, International Artists, Rock-a-Billy and Big Orange record labels for a total of sixteen 45 sides and two vinyl LPs. Some of this material has also appeared on compact disc anthologies by Ace Records. Approximately eighty minutes of Allen’s recordings remain unreleased.

== Biography ==
Allen was born in Houston, Texas but his family moved to Franklin, a farming and ranching community in central Texas, just before he started school. Allen exhibited musical talent at an early age, picking out melodies on the mandolin when he was five years old and playing the fiddle on a local radio program in nearby College Station shortly thereafter. He got his first guitar, a Silvertone archtop from Sears, at the age of twelve. Allen turned professional at the age of fourteen, playing regularly with Richard Smith and the Hill Boppers. Although mostly familiar only with country music up to this point, Allen saw one of Elvis Presley’s early Texas performances in 1955 and began to emulate the playing style of Presley’s guitarist, Scotty Moore. Rockabilly and rock ‘n’ roll soon became his main interest and he acquired a 1956 Fender Stratocaster and a Silvertone amplifier.

Allen’s family returned to Houston in 1957 where he enrolled in Sam Houston High School and became a regular member of the house band at Van’s Club, later known as Van’s Ballroom. Here he took the stage name “Rockin’ Dave Allen.” His band was called The Thunderbirds. In the fall of 1959, Allen bought a Fender Jazzmaster and had his first record release on Jin records, “Give Me One More Chance” backed with “Rose Marie.” Both were original compositions by Allen. “My Broken Heart” followed and was his first record to hit the southern charts. With his third release “Shirley Jean” and then with his fourth “Walking Slowly,” Allen broke into the Top 10 charts of the south. These pop singles led to TV appearances, concert tours and dates at the largest clubs across the southern U.S. alongside such stars as Jimmy Clanton, Roy Orbison, Bobby Vee, Charlie Rich, Mickey Gilley, Bobby “Blue” Bland, Jimmy Reed, Roy Head, Doug Sahm, Chuck Jackson, T-Bone Walker, Bobby Vinton, Gene Thomas, Johnnie Allan, Rod Bernard, Joe Barry, Jivin’ Gene and Doug Kershaw. This was the most financially successful period of Allen’s career.

Allen had become an avid listener of Houston’s two African-American radio stations, KCOH and KYOK, and the rhythm and blues they both played, music that had not generally been available to him growing up in Franklin. He became an ardent admirer of Jimmy Reed and B.B. King and covered Reed’s song “Can’t Stand to See You Go” on the Jin label in 1960. From that point on, he gravitated towards playing mostly blues.

Following the British Invasion in 1964, Allen found himself without a recording contract after cutting four 45 sides for Huey Meaux. Allen dropped the adjective “Rockin’” from his name and made his living performing live with his recently purchased Gibson ES-345 and Fender Twin Reverb amplifier. In 1968, Lelan Rogers of International Artists Records (hereinafter referred to as IA) in Houston signed Allen to a recording contract. The label was primarily known for its roster of Texas psychedelic rock bands, including the 13th Floor Elevators, Bubble Puppy and the Red Krayola. IA was also a part-owner of the Love Street Light Circus Feel Good Machine, a psychedelic nightclub at Allen’s Landing where Allen sometimes performed.

Allen recorded with Big Walter Price “The Thunderbird” and wrote and played for blue-eyed soul singer Jimmy Rogers at IA before recording his own album Color Blind, composed of eleven original songs recorded in the fall of 1968 and released in the summer of 1969. This was the eleventh of only twelve albums released by IA and its only blues album other than Free Form Patterns by Lightnin’ Hopkins.

Due to a lack of promotion and distribution along with other factors relating to IA’s impending bankruptcy, Color Blind was not a success at the time. Nevertheless, Allen had the opportunity to begin recording a second album before creditors padlocked the doors to IA Studios (now SugarHill Studios). From these February 1970 sessions, two tracks, “Saturday A.M. Blues” and a cover of “C.C. Rider” still exist and have appeared on IA anthologies. Three other tracks, “Mardi Gras,” “Lord, Take Me Today” and a cover of “Folsom Prison Blues” are presumed lost.

Allen's disappointment following Color Blind, combined with his concomitant divorce and the relocation of his young daughter to another state, triggered a depressive disorder with which Allen would struggle for the remainder of his life. His daily use of terpin hydrate elixir with codeine (until such time as it was no longer available over the counter), alcohol and tobacco exacerbated his mental condition and compromised his physical health. Allen performed onstage throughout the Houston area up until his death from pneumonia in 1985 at the age of 43.

In 1979, Rock-a-Billy Productions of Lafayette, Louisiana compiled all ten of Allen’s Jin singles into a vinyl LP entitled Southern Rock ‘n’ Roll of the ’60s. Allen himself wrote the liner notes for this reissue. In 1989, Charly Records reissued Color Blind on vinyl on the Decal label. Beginning in the early 1990s, Allen’s Jin singles began to appear on swamp pop anthologies by Ace Records on compact disc. In November 2010, Snapper Music issued a deluxe, limited edition of Color Blind, its first-ever release on compact disc. Allen’s numerous unreleased demos and a tape of a live performance from 1972 are being held in trust by his heirs for future consideration.
