= C24H32N2O2 =

The molecular formula C_{24}H_{32}N_{2}O_{2} (molar mass: 380.52 g/mol, exact mass: 380.2464 u) may refer to:

- Eprazinone
- 4-Methoxybutyrfentanyl
- R-30490
