= Mollipect =

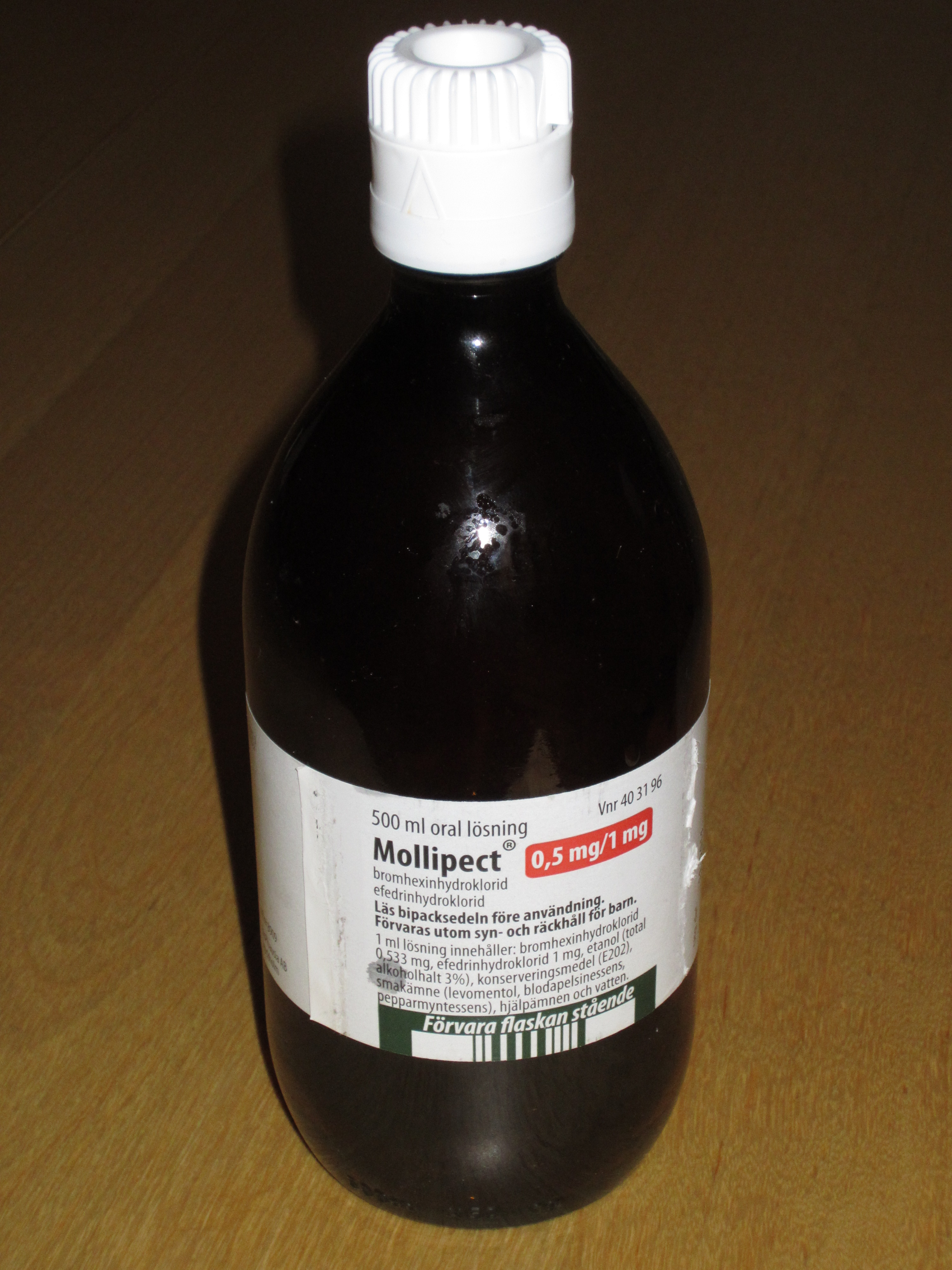
A bottle of Mollipect

Mollipect is a trade name for a medication whose active substances are:

- Bromhexine, a mucolytic agent. In addition, bromhexine has antioxidant properties.
- Ephedrine, a sympathomimetic amine with (among others) stimulant and decongestant effect.

It is prescribed for coughs with thick mucus, and also has a bronchodilating effect.
