= Elixir =

Sweet-flavored liquid used for medicinal purposes

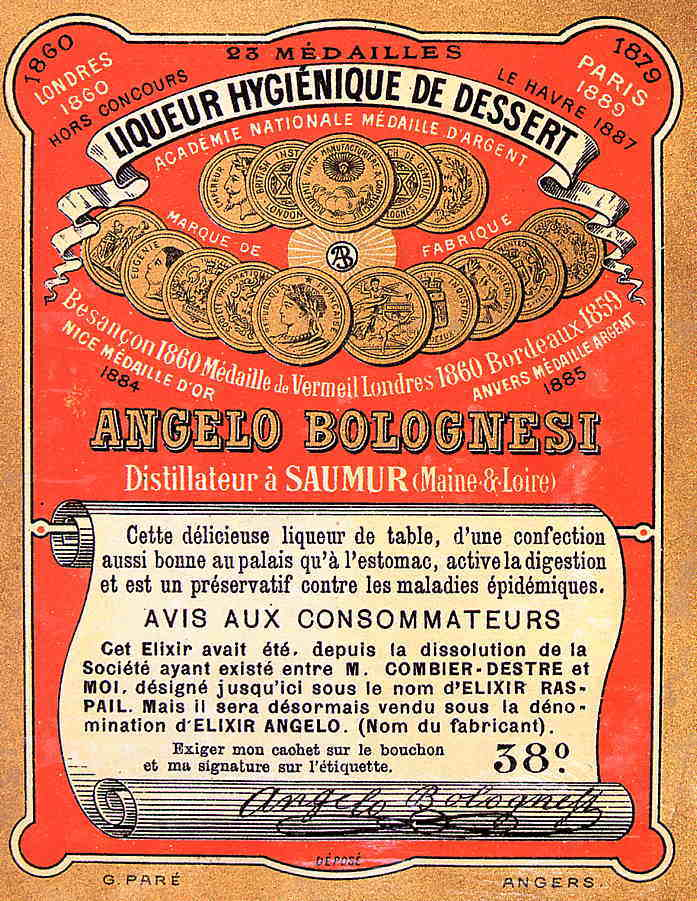
Label from a bottle of Elixir Raspail, claiming its effectiveness against epidemic diseases

An elixir is a sweet liquid used for medical purposes, to be taken orally and intended to cure one's illness. When used as a pharmaceutical preparation, an elixir contains at least one active ingredient designed to be taken orally.

== Etymology ==
The word was introduced in late Middle English, through Latin from the Arabic الإكسير (al-ʾiksīr), which in turn is the Arabization of the Ancient Greek ξήριον (xērion) 'powder for drying wounds' (from ξηρός (xēros) 'dry'). For centuries, elixir primarily meant an ingredient used in alchemy, either referring to a liquid which purportedly converts lead to gold, or a substance or liquid which is believed to cure all ills and give eternal life. That which would indefinitely prolong life (more fully elixir vitae, "elixir of life") was considered to be closely related to, or even identical with, the substance for transmuting metals.

== Types ==
=== Non-medicated elixirs ===
These are used as solvents or vehicles for the preparation of medicated elixirs. Active ingredients are dissolved in a 15–50% by volume solution of ethyl alcohol:

- aromatic elixirs (USP)
- isoalcoholic elixirs (NF)
- compound benzaldehyde elixirs (NF)

=== Medicated elixirs ===
These include:

- antihistaminic elixirs used against allergy, such as chlorpheniramine maleate (USP) or diphenhydramine HCl
- sedative and hypnotic elixirs, the former to induce drowsiness, the latter to induce sleep
- pediatric elixirs such as chloral hydrate
- expectorant elixirs used to facilitate productive cough (i.e. cough with sputum), such as terpin hydrate

=== East Asian vitamin drinks ===
Daily non-alcoholic non-caffeinated 'vitamin drinks' have been popular in East Asia since the 1950s, with Oronamin from Otsuka Pharmaceutical perhaps the market leader. Packaged in brown light-proof bottles, these drinks have the reputation of being enjoyed by old men and other health-conscious individuals. Counterparts exist in South Korea and China.

Western energy drinks typically have caffeine and are targeted at a younger demographic, with colorful labels and printed claims of increased athletic/daily performance.

=== Pseudomedicinal drinks ===
Daffy's Elixir is reputed to have been invented by clergyman Thomas Daffy, rector of Redmile, Leicestershire, in 1647; and remained popular in Britain and the US until the late 19th century. Daffy named it "elixir salutis" (lit. elixir of health) and promoted it as a generic cure-all.

== Composition ==
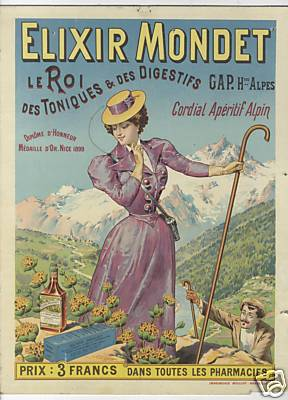
Poster for Elixir Mondet, 1899

An elixir is a hydro-alcoholic solution of at least one active ingredient. The alcohol is mainly used to:

- Solubilize the active ingredient(s) and some excipients
- Retard the crystallization of sugar
- Preserve the finished product
- Provide a sharpness to the taste
- Aid in masking the unpleasant taste of the active ingredient(s)
- Enhance the flavor.

The lowest alcoholic quantity that will dissolve completely the active ingredient(s) and give a clear solution is generally chosen. High concentrations of alcohol give burning taste to the final product.

An elixir may also contain the following excipients:

- Sugar and/or sugar substitutes like the sugar polyols glycerol and sorbitol.
- Preservatives like parabens and benzoates and antioxidants like butylated hydroxytoluene (BHT) and sodium metabisulfite.
- Buffering agents
- Chelating agents like sodium ethylenediaminetetraacetic acid (EDTA)
- Flavoring agents and flavor enhancers
- Coloring agents

== Storage ==
Elixirs should only be stored in a tightly closed, light resistant container away from direct heat and sunlight.

== See also ==
- Brompton cocktail
- Concoction
- Elixir of life
- Internal alchemy
- Energy drink
- Soft drink
- Panacea (medicine), mythological remedy that would cure all diseases
- Suspension (chemistry)
- Syrup
- Spagyric
- Herbal tea
- Tincture, in which alcohol is the major solvent and the ingredient is often highly concentrated.
- Theriac
- Hot toddy
