= ATC code R05 =

ATC code R05 Cough and cold preparations is a therapeutic subgroup of the Anatomical Therapeutic Chemical Classification System, a system of alphanumeric codes developed by the World Health Organization (WHO) for the classification of drugs and other medical products. Subgroup R05 is part of the anatomical group R Respiratory system.

Codes for veterinary use (ATCvet codes) can be created by placing the letter Q in front of the human ATC code: for example, QR05. ATCvet codes without corresponding human ATC codes are cited with the leading Q in the following list.
National versions of the ATC classification may include additional codes not present in this list, which follows the WHO version.

== R05C Expectorants, excluding combinations with cough suppressants ==
=== R05CA Expectorants ===
R05CA01 Tyloxapol
R05CA02 Potassium iodide
R05CA03 Guaifenesin
R05CA04 Ipecacuanha
R05CA05 Altheae radix
R05CA06 Senega
R05CA07 Antimony pentasulfide
R05CA08 Creosote
R05CA09 Guaiacolsulfonate
R05CA10 Combinations
R05CA11 Levoverbenone
R05CA12 Hederae helicis folium
R05CA13 Cineole

=== R05CB Mucolytics ===
R05CB01 Acetylcysteine
R05CB02 Bromhexine
R05CB03 Carbocisteine
R05CB04 Eprazinone
R05CB05 Mesna
R05CB06 Ambroxol
R05CB07 Sobrerol
R05CB08 Domiodol
R05CB09 Letosteine
R05CB10 Combinations
R05CB11 Stepronin
R05CB13 Dornase alfa (desoxyribonuclease)
R05CB14 Neltenexine
R05CB15 Erdosteine
R05CB16 Mannitol
QR05CB90 Dembrexine hydrochloride

== R05D Cough suppressants, excluding combinations with expectorants ==
=== R05DA Opium alkaloids and derivatives ===
R05DA01 Ethylmorphine
R05DA03 Hydrocodone
R05DA04 Codeine
R05DA05 Opium alkaloids with morphine
R05DA06 Normethadone
R05DA07 Noscapine
R05DA08 Pholcodine
R05DA09 Dextromethorphan
R05DA10 Thebacon
R05DA11 Dimemorfan
R05DA12 Acetyldihydrocodeine
R05DA20 Combinations (QR05DA20 Combinations of opium alkaloids and derivatives)
QR05DA90 Butorphanol

=== R05DB Other cough suppressants ===
R05DB01 Benzonatate
R05DB02 Benproperine
R05DB03 Clobutinol
R05DB04 Isoaminile
R05DB05 Pentoxyverine
R05DB07 Oxolamine
R05DB09 Oxeladin
R05DB10 Clofedanol
R05DB11 Pipazetate
R05DB12 Bibenzonium bromide
R05DB13 Butamirate
R05DB14 Fedrilate
R05DB15 Zipeprol
R05DB16 Dibunate
R05DB17 Droxypropine
R05DB18 Prenoxdiazine
R05DB19 Dropropizine
R05DB20 Combinations
R05DB21 Cloperastine
R05DB22 Meprotixol
R05DB23 Piperidione
R05DB24 Tipepidine
R05DB25 Morclofone
R05DB26 Nepinalone
R05DB27 Levodropropizine
R05DB28 Dimethoxanate
R05DB29 Gefapixant

== R05F Cough suppressants and expectorants, combinations ==
=== R05FA Opium derivatives and expectorants ===
R05FA01 Opium derivatives and mucolytics
R05FA02 Opium derivatives and expectorants

=== R05FB Other cough suppressants and expectorants ===
R05FB01 Cough suppressants and mucolytics
R05FB02 Cough suppressants and expectorants

== R05X Other cold preparations ==
Empty group
