= Ephedrine/ethylmorphine =

Combination antitussive drug

Combination of
- Ephedrine: sympathomimetic
- Ethylmorphine: opiate

Clinical data
- Trade names: Lepheton

Ephedrine/ethylmorphine (Lepheton) is a combination drug used as an antitussive. It consists of ethylmorphine (an opiate) and ephedrine (a sympathomimetic).
