= Lemsip =

Brand of medication

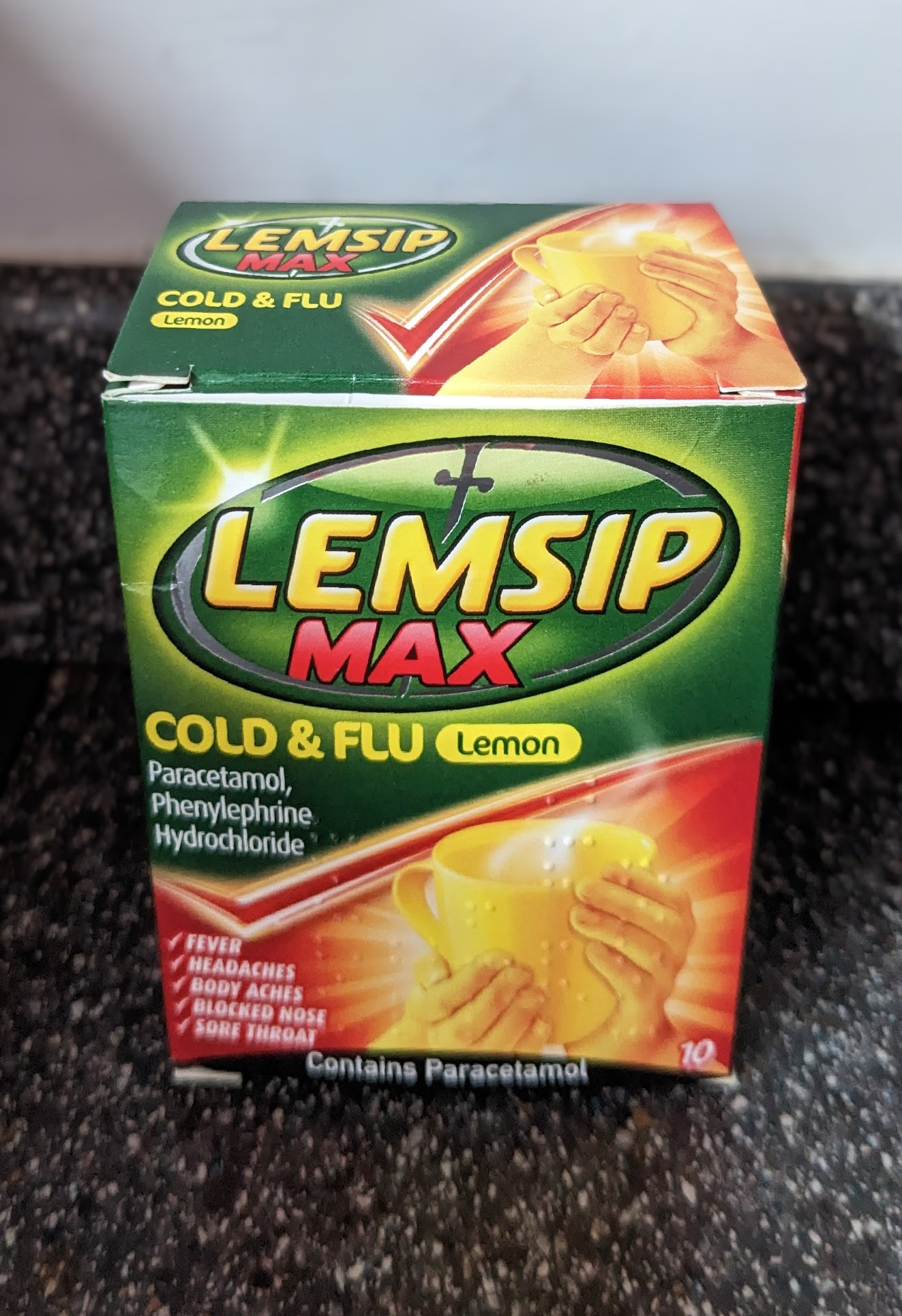
- Lemsip Max
- Product type: Cold medicine
- Produced by: Reckitt
- Country: UK
- Introduced: 1969; 57 years ago
- Markets: UK
- Website: lemsip.co.uk

Lemsip is a British brand of cold and flu remedies for treating people with cold, cough and flu by Reckitt, a UK-based consumer goods company.

== History ==
Originally called LEM-SIP, the product was first introduced in 1969. In the 1970s, Reckitt rebranded the product to Lemsip and included the 'sword in a glass' logo on packaging.

== Products ==
Their original and best-known product is the lemon-flavoured hot drink containing 650 mg of paracetamol (an analgesic), and 10 mg phenylephrine hydrochloride (a decongestant) to help to relieve headache, fever, blocked nose, body aches and pains, and a sore throat.

In 1995 the Lemsip Max range was launched, which included lemon, blackcurrant and "Breathe Easy" hot drink flavours, and saw a variety of capsule products added to the range, including Lemsip Max Cold & Flu Capsules. The entire Lemsip Max range contains the maximum level of active ingredients allowed for general sales listing in the UK. In 2016 it was the fourth biggest selling branded over-the-counter medication sold in Great Britain, with sales of £63.9 million.

In 2007 Lemsip launched Lemsip Max All In One hot drinks in Lemon, Wild Berry and Hot Orange, and Breathe Easy flavours. In 2008 Lemsip launched a Liquid into the Lemsip Max All In One range. The range contains 200 mg of guaifenesin which helps to relieve chesty cough, in addition to 1000 mg of paracetamol and 12.2 mg of phenylephrine hydrochloride (12.18 mg of phenylephrine hydrochloride in Lemsip Max All In One Liquid) which aims to relieve headache, sore throat, fever, body aches and pains, and a blocked nose.

The Lemsip range now contains capsules, tablets, liquids, and hot drink sachets.

== Side effects, contraindications, and interactions ==
Possible side effects include hypersensitivity, blood problems or, above the recommended dose, pancreatitis and vomiting.

Taking Lemsip alongside other medicine containing paracetamol can cause an overdose, potentially resulting in serious liver and kidney damage.

Phenylephrine, which alongside paracetamol is one of Lemsip's two primary active ingredients and is intended to be responsible for most of the product's claimed effects, was discovered to be ineffective as a decongestant in 2015, leading some pharmacists to call for the ingredient to be banned.

== Manufacturing ==
Lemsip is manufactured in parent company Reckitt's Hull and Nottingham sites.
