= Isoaminile =

Chemical compound

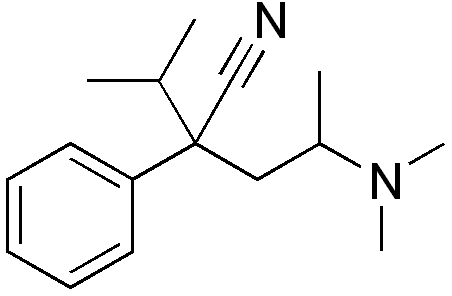

Clinical data
- AHFS/Drugs.com: International Drug Names
- ATC code: R05DB04 (WHO)

Identifiers
- IUPAC name: 4-(dimethylamino)-2-isopropyl-2-phenylpentanenitrile
- CAS Number: 77-51-0
- PubChem CID: 6481
- DrugBank: DB08944
- ChemSpider: 6236
- UNII: R4823W2PQL
- KEGG: D08088
- CompTox Dashboard (EPA): DTXSID5057830
- ECHA InfoCard: 100.000.940

Chemical and physical data
- Formula: C_{16}H_{24}N_{2}
- Molar mass: 244.382 g·mol^{−1}
- 3D model (JSmol): Interactive image
- SMILES: N#CC(c1ccccc1)(C(C)C)CC(N(C)C)C
- InChI: InChI=1S/C16H24N2/c1-13(2)16(12-17,11-14(3)18(4)5)15-9-7-6-8-10-15/h6-10,13-14H,11H2,1-5H3; Key:WFLSCFISQHLEED-UHFFFAOYSA-N

Isoaminile is an antitussive (cough suppressant) used under the trade-name Peracon.

The normal therapeutic dose is 40–80 mg of the cyclamate salt, with a maximum of five doses in a 24-hour period. In addition to its central antitussive effects, it is also an anticholinergic, exhibiting both antimuscarinic and antinicotinic actions.
