= Nepinalone =

Chemical compound

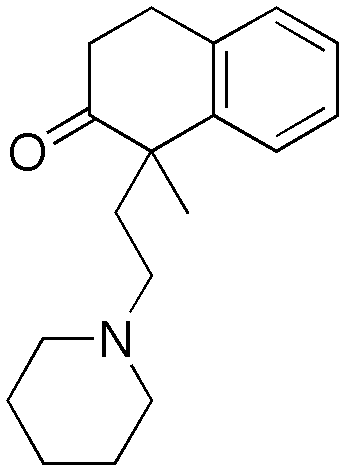

Clinical data
- ATC code: R05DB26 (WHO)

Identifiers
- IUPAC name: 1-methyl-1-(2-piperidin-1-ylethyl)-3,4-dihydronaphthalen-2(1H)-one
- CAS Number: 22443-11-4
- PubChem CID: 3047788
- ChemSpider: 2310106
- UNII: L9806LPR7G
- KEGG: D07396
- CompTox Dashboard (EPA): DTXSID60865051

Chemical and physical data
- Formula: C_{18}H_{25}NO
- Molar mass: 271.404 g·mol^{−1}
- 3D model (JSmol): Interactive image
- SMILES: O=C2C(c1ccccc1CC2)(CCN3CCCCC3)C
- InChI: InChI=1S/C18H25NO/c1-18(11-14-19-12-5-2-6-13-19)16-8-4-3-7-15(16)9-10-17(18)20/h3-4,7-8H,2,5-6,9-14H2,1H3; Key:RVXGRCNWGOHSDE-UHFFFAOYSA-N

Nepinalone is a cough suppressant. Its brand names include Placatus, Tussolvina, and Nepitus.

The effect is evident after 20–30 minutes after administration and persists for at least 4 hours. It acts primarily at the level of the CNS, but also shows a slight activity in inhibiting the bronchospasm. In such use, it is less effective than codeine and more effective than dextromethorphan in inhibiting the tussive stimulus.
