= Neltenexine =

Chemical compound

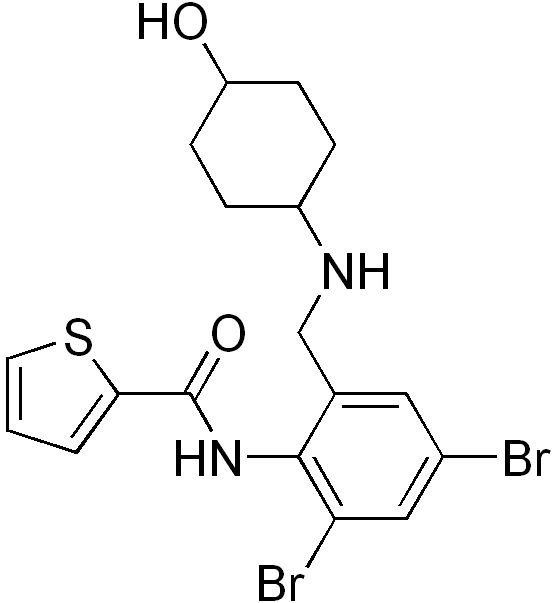

Clinical data
- Trade names: Alveoten
- ATC code: R05CB14 (WHO)

Identifiers
- IUPAC name: N-(2,4-dibromo-6-{[(4-hydroxycyclohexyl)amino]methyl}phenyl)thiophene-2-carboxamide
- CAS Number: 99453-84-6
- PubChem CID: 3047787
- ChemSpider: 16736685
- UNII: U942DGM90X
- KEGG: D07382
- CompTox Dashboard (EPA): DTXSID50905076

Chemical and physical data
- Formula: C_{18}H_{20}Br_{2}N_{2}O_{2}S
- Molar mass: 488.24 g·mol^{−1}
- 3D model (JSmol): Interactive image
- SMILES: O=C(Nc2c(CN[C@@H]1CC[C@@H](O)CC1)cc(Br)cc2Br)c3cccs3
- InChI: InChI=1S/C18H20Br2N2O2S/c19-12-8-11(10-21-13-3-5-14(23)6-4-13)17(15(20)9-12)22-18(24)16-2-1-7-25-16/h1-2,7-9,13-14,21,23H,3-6,10H2,(H,22,24)/t13-,14-; Key:SSLHKNBKUBAHJY-HDJSIYSDSA-N

Neltenexine (trade name Alveoten) is a mucolytic.
