= Meprotixol =

Chemical compound

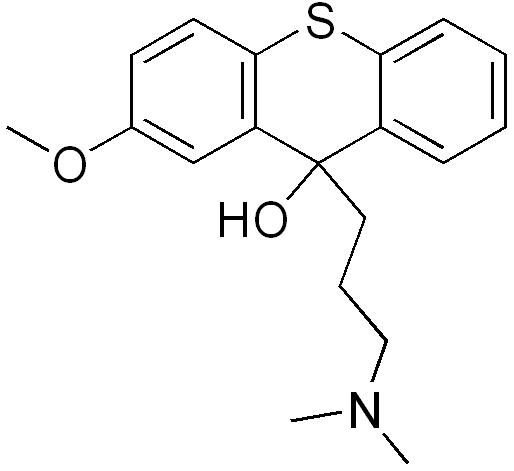

Clinical data
- ATC code: R05DB22 (WHO)

Identifiers
- IUPAC name: 9-(3-Dimethylaminopropyl)-2-methoxy-9H-thioxanthen-9-ol
- CAS Number: 4295-63-0
- PubChem CID: 71195
- ChemSpider: 64331
- UNII: 2JXZ154Z0Q
- KEGG: D07394
- CompTox Dashboard (EPA): DTXSID40863358

Chemical and physical data
- Formula: C_{19}H_{23}NO_{2}S
- Molar mass: 329.46 g·mol^{−1}
- 3D model (JSmol): Interactive image
- SMILES: O(c3cc2c(Sc1ccccc1C2(O)CCCN(C)C)cc3)C
- InChI: InChI=1S/C19H23NO2S/c1-20(2)12-6-11-19(21)15-7-4-5-8-17(15)23-18-10-9-14(22-3)13-16(18)19/h4-5,7-10,13,21H,6,11-12H2,1-3H3; Key:LAYVFLWAVIGDLK-UHFFFAOYSA-N

Meprotixol is a cough suppressant. It has also been used for the treatment of rheumatic diseases.
