= Clofedanol =

Chemical compound

Clinical data
- Trade names: Coldrin, Gentos, Pectolitan, Ulo, Ulone
- AHFS/Drugs.com: Micromedex Detailed Consumer Information
- Routes of administration: Oral
- ATC code: R05DB10 (WHO)

Legal status
- Legal status: US: OTC; OTC in Japan and the US

Identifiers
- IUPAC name: 1-(2-chlorophenyl)-3-dimethylamino- 1-phenyl-propan-1-ol
- CAS Number: 791-35-5
- PubChem CID: 2795
- IUPHAR/BPS: 7324
- DrugBank: DB04837
- ChemSpider: 2693
- UNII: 42C50P12AP
- KEGG: D07721
- ChEMBL: ChEMBL1201313
- CompTox Dashboard (EPA): DTXSID4022789
- ECHA InfoCard: 100.011.219

Chemical and physical data
- Formula: C_{17}H_{20}ClNO
- Molar mass: 289.80 g·mol^{−1}
- 3D model (JSmol): Interactive image
- SMILES: Clc1ccccc1C(O)(c2ccccc2)CCN(C)C
- InChI: InChI=1S/C17H20ClNO/c1-19(2)13-12-17(20,14-8-4-3-5-9-14)15-10-6-7-11-16(15)18/h3-11,20H,12-13H2,1-2H3; Key:WRCHFMBCVFFYEQ-UHFFFAOYSA-N

Clofedanol (INN) or chlophedianol (BAN), sold under the brand name Ninjacof among others, is a centrally acting cough suppressant used in the treatment of dry cough. Clofedanol has local anesthetic, antispasmodic, and antihistamine properties, and may have anticholinergic effects at high doses.

== Side effects ==
Adverse effects may include irritability, drowsiness, nightmares, vertigo, nausea or vomiting, visual disturbances or hallucinations, and urticaria. There are potential interactions with other anticholinergics, CNS depressants, and alcohol.

== Pharmacology ==
Unlike many other antitussive drugs such as dextromethorphan, it binds poorly to the sigma-1 receptor.

== Society and culture ==
Chlophedianol was approved for OTC status in 1987 by the FDA OTC monograph process and its safety and efficacy data are limited. It was formerly sold over-the-counter in the United States under the trade name Ulo, as a syrup with a dosage of 25 mg/5 mL. It is now marketed under the brand name of Ninjacof and others in the U.S.

It is marketed in Canada under the trade name Ulone. GM Pharmaceuticals owns the patents to 113 combinations with Chlophedianol and was the first company to launch the cough suppressant in the United States.

It is sold in Japan as an over-the-counter drug under the name Coldrin. It has been marketed in Germany as Pectolitan and in Spain as Gentos.

== See also ==
- Azacyclonol
