= Morclofone =

Chemical compound

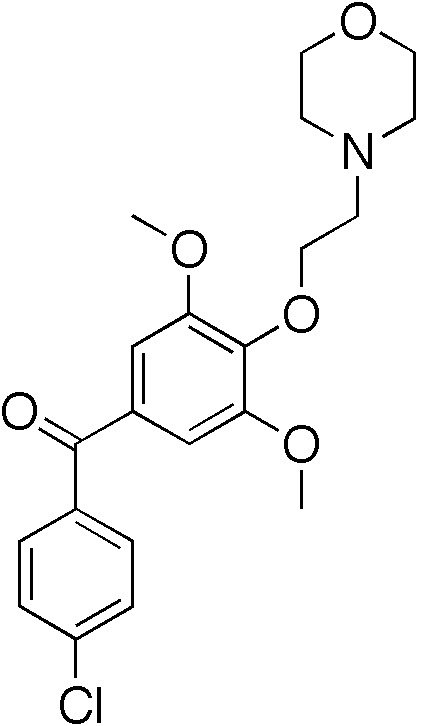

Clinical data
- AHFS/Drugs.com: International Drug Names
- ATC code: R05DB25 (WHO)

Identifiers
- IUPAC name: (4-chlorophenyl)-[3,5-dimethoxy-4-(2-morpholin-4-ylethoxy)phenyl]methanone
- CAS Number: 31848-01-8
- PubChem CID: 35949
- ChemSpider: 33063
- UNII: VY62TIB872
- KEGG: D07395
- CompTox Dashboard (EPA): DTXSID50185710
- ECHA InfoCard: 100.046.202

Chemical and physical data
- Formula: C_{21}H_{24}ClNO_{5}
- Molar mass: 405.88 g·mol^{−1}
- 3D model (JSmol): Interactive image
- SMILES: Clc1ccc(cc1)C(=O)c3cc(OC)c(OCCN2CCOCC2)c(OC)c3
- InChI: InChI=1S/C21H24ClNO5/c1-25-18-13-16(20(24)15-3-5-17(22)6-4-15)14-19(26-2)21(18)28-12-9-23-7-10-27-11-8-23/h3-6,13-14H,7-12H2,1-2H3; Key:KVCJCEKJKGLBOK-UHFFFAOYSA-N

Morclofone is a cough suppressant.
