= Tyloxapol =

Pharmaceutical drug

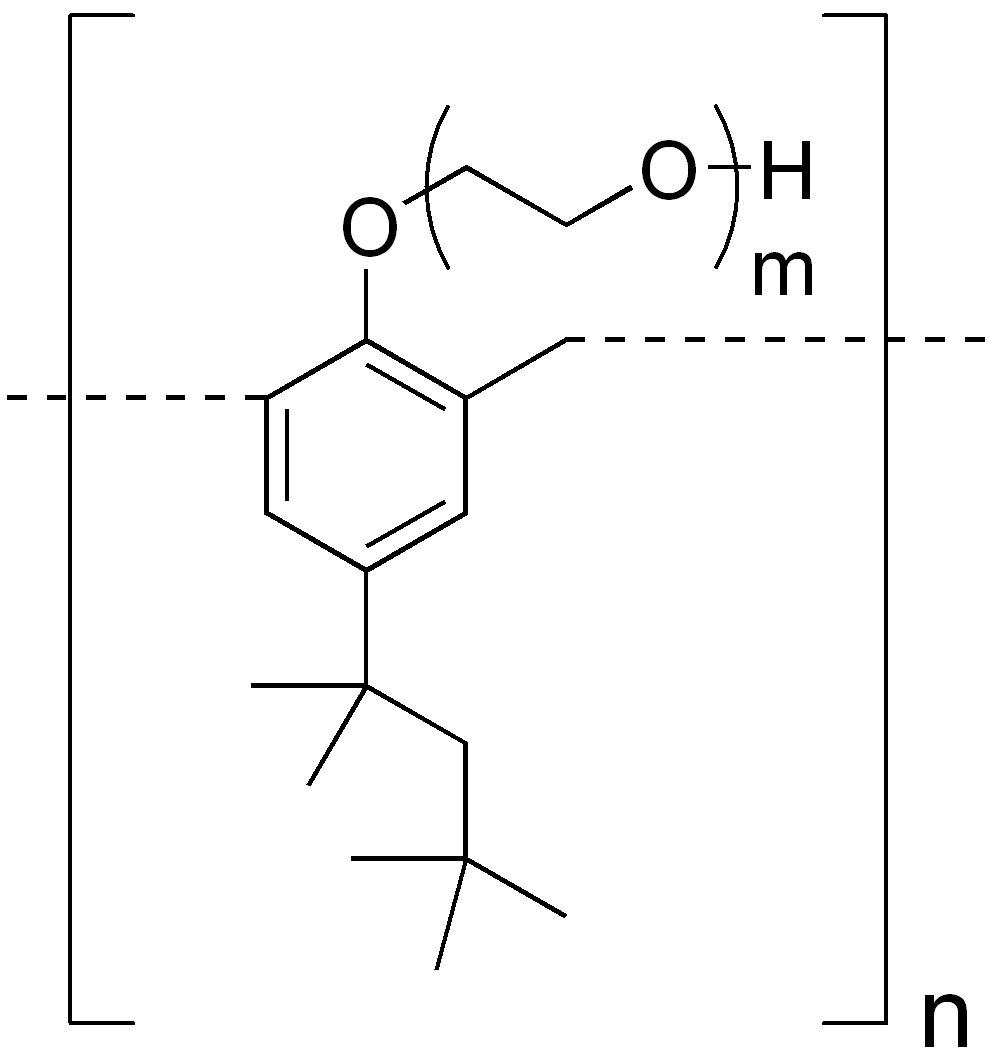

Clinical data
- AHFS/Drugs.com: International Drug Names
- ATC code: R05CA01 (WHO)

Identifiers
- IUPAC name: formaldehyde;oxirane;4-(2,4,4-trimethylpentan-2-yl)phenol
- CAS Number: 25301-02-4
- PubChem CID: 71388
- DrugBank: DB06439
- ChemSpider: None
- UNII: Y27PUL9H56
- KEGG: D03261
- ChEBI: CHEBI:141517
- ChEMBL: ChEMBL1201548
- CompTox Dashboard (EPA): DTXSID30179950
- ECHA InfoCard: 100.209.660

Chemical and physical data
- Formula: (C_{15}H_{21}O(C_{2}H_{4}O)_{m})_{n}
- Molar mass: variable

Tyloxapol is a nonionic liquid polymer of the alkyl aryl polyether alcohol type. It is used as a surfactant to aid liquefaction and removal of mucopurulent (containing mucus and pus) bronchopulmonary secretions, administered by inhalation through a nebulizer or with a stream of oxygen.

With intraperitoneal injection, tyloxapol also blocks plasma lipolytic activity, and thus the breakdown of triglyceride-rich lipoproteins. This mechanism is used to induce experimental hyperlipidemia in animals.

Tyloxapol is the main active ingredient of the medical device Tacholiquin. Tacholiquin is an expectorant designated for inhalation and instillation reaching the upper and lower airways. Other brand names of pharmaceutical products containing Tyloxapol are Exosurf and Alevaire.
