= GT-02287 =

Clinical data
- Other names: GT02287
- Routes of administration: Oral
- Drug class: β-Glucocerebrosidase (GCase) activator or positive allosteric modulator and/or chaperone

GT-02287 is a β-glucocerebrosidase (GCase) activator, positive allosteric modulator, and/or chaperone which is under development for the treatment of Parkinson's disease, Gaucher's disease, solid tumors, and dementia. It is taken orally.

The drug is under development by Gain Therapeutics. As of January 2026, it is in phase 1 clinical trials for Parkinson's disease, the preclinical research stage of development for Gaucher's disease and solid tumors, and the research stage of development for dementia. GT-02287 was also under development for alpha 1-antitrypsin deficiency, globoid cell leukodystrophy, and GM1 gangliosidosis, but development for these indications was discontinued.

Rexaceract (INN) structure.

The chemical structure of GT-02287 does not yet appear to have been disclosed. However, Gain Therapeutics has patented GCase allosteric chaperones, notably including rexaceract (INN), which is described as a β-glucocerebrosidase positive allosteric modulator and antiparkinsonian agent. Gain Therapeutics is or was also developing another GCase activator, GT-02329, to treat Gaucher's disease and Parkinson's disease, but no recent development has been reported for this candidate.

== See also ==
- List of investigational Parkinson's disease drugs
- Pariceract (BIA 28–6156; LTI-291)
- Ambroxol
