= Letosteine =

Chemical compound

Clinical data
- Trade names: Viscotiol
- Other names: 2-[2-(ethoxycarbonylmethylsulfanyl)ethyl]-1,3-thiazolidine-4-carboxylic acid
- Routes of administration: Oral (gastroresistant capsules)
- ATC code: R05CB09 (WHO)

Identifiers
- IUPAC name: 2-[2-(2-ethoxy-2-oxoethyl)sulfanylethyl]-1,3-thiazolidine-4-carboxylic acid
- CAS Number: 53943-88-7
- PubChem CID: 68707
- DrugBank: DB08939
- ChemSpider: 61958
- UNII: 6MVF9U95DW
- KEGG: D07380
- ChEBI: CHEBI:88271
- CompTox Dashboard (EPA): DTXSID70866372
- ECHA InfoCard: 100.053.509

Chemical and physical data
- Formula: C_{10}H_{17}NO_{4}S_{2}
- Molar mass: 279.37 g·mol^{−1}
- 3D model (JSmol): Interactive image
- SMILES: O=C(O)C1NC(SC1)CCSCC(=O)OCC
- InChI: InChI=1S/C10H17NO4S2/c1-2-15-9(12)6-16-4-3-8-11-7(5-17-8)10(13)14/h7-8,11H,2-6H2,1H3,(H,13,14); Key:IKOCLISPVJZJEA-UHFFFAOYSA-N

Letosteine is a mucolytic patented (U.S. patent 6987120) by Piero del Soldato of Milan, Italy. He filed his application in 2000.
