= Bromhexine =

Mucolytic drug

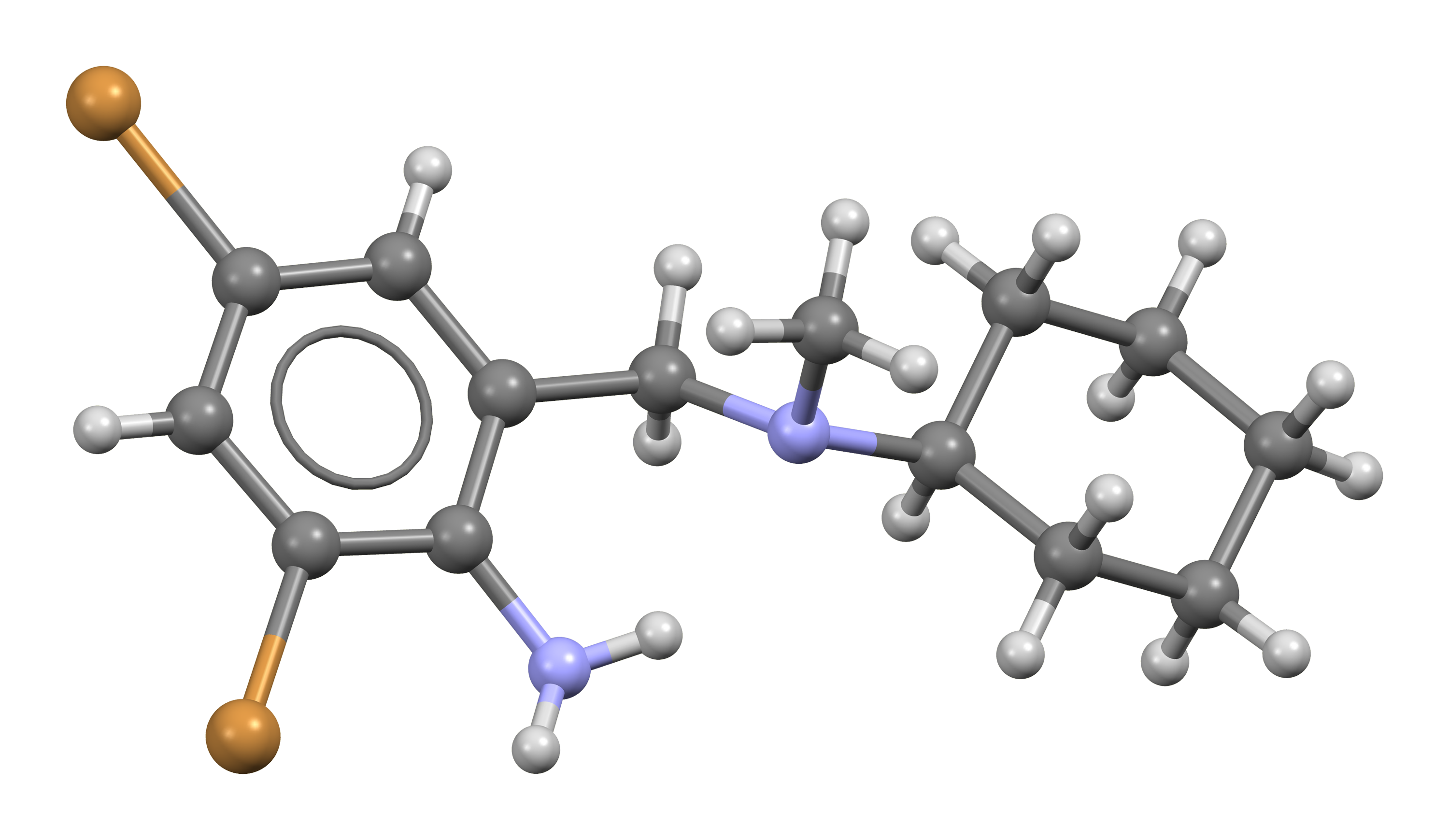

Clinical data
- Trade names: Bisolvon, others
- AHFS/Drugs.com: International Drug Names
- Pregnancy category: AU: A
- ATC code: R05CB02 (WHO)

Legal status
- Legal status: AU: S2 (Pharmacy medicine); SE: OTC

Pharmacokinetic data
- Bioavailability: 22-27%
- Protein binding: ~95%
- Metabolism: Extensive hepatic
- Metabolites: Ambroxol, others
- Elimination half-life: 6.6-31.4 hr
- Excretion: Urine

Identifiers
- IUPAC name: 2,4-Dibromo-6-{[cyclohexyl(methyl)amino]methyl}aniline
- CAS Number: 3572-43-8
- PubChem CID: 2442
- DrugBank: DB09019
- ChemSpider: 2348
- UNII: Q1J152VB1P
- KEGG: D07542
- ChEBI: CHEBI:77032
- ChEMBL: ChEMBL253376
- CompTox Dashboard (EPA): DTXSID6022686
- ECHA InfoCard: 100.020.622

Chemical and physical data
- Formula: C_{14}H_{20}Br_{2}N_{2}
- Molar mass: 376.136 g·mol^{−1}
- 3D model (JSmol): Interactive image
- SMILES: Brc1cc(c(N)c(Br)c1)CN(C)C2CCCCC2
- InChI: InChI=1S/C14H20Br2N2/c1-18(12-5-3-2-4-6-12)9-10-7-11(15)8-13(16)14(10)17/h7-8,12H,2-6,9,17H2,1H3; Key:OJGDCBLYJGHCIH-UHFFFAOYSA-N

Bromhexine (bromhexine hydrochloride), sold under the brand name Bisolvon among others, is a mucoactive agent used in the treatment of respiratory disorders associated with viscous or excessive mucus from the common cold, influenza, or other respiratory infections. Its use is intended to clear mucus from the respiratory tract. It has mild side effects.

Bromhexine is derived from the substances contained in the plant Justicia adhatoda, and was developed by Boehringer Ingelheim in the late 1950s for pharmaceutical use. Patented in 1961, it was introduced in 1963 under the trademark of Bisolvon and marketed in 1966.

== Combinations ==
The drug may be manufactured in various combinations with other compounds, including amoxicillin, ampicillin or vitamin C, among others.

== Function ==
Bromhexine is intended to clear mucus from the respiratory tract. It is secretolytic, increasing the production of serous mucus in the respiratory tract, which thins phlegm. This contributes to a secretomotoric effect, allowing the cilia to more easily transport the phlegm out of the upper respiratory tract. For this reason, it may be added to cough syrups. Its mechanism of action is not well-identified, remaining in laboratory research, as of 2026.

It has been shown to increase the proportion of serous bronchial secretion, making it more easily expectorated. It is indicated as "secretolytic therapy in bronchopulmonary diseases associated with abnormal mucus secretion and impaired mucus transport".

Bromhexine is contained in various formulations, such as high and low strength syrups in concentrations of 8 mg/5 ml, 4 mg/5 ml, tablets and soluble tablets (both with 8 mg bromhexine), and solution for oral use in a strength of 10 mg/5 ml. The posology varies with age and weight, but products exist for all age groups.

== Brand names ==
Bromhexine is sold under hundreds of brand names.
