= Dimethoxanate =

Chemical compound

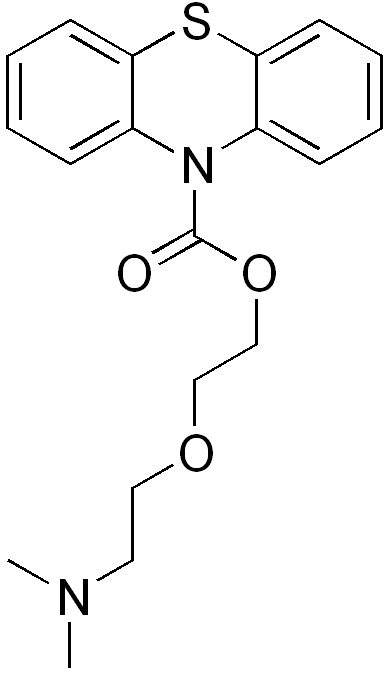

Clinical data
- Trade names: Atuss, Cothera, Cotrane, Perlatos, Pulmoll, Tussizid
- AHFS/Drugs.com: International Drug Names
- ATC code: R05DB28 (WHO)

Identifiers
- IUPAC name: 2-(2-dimethylaminoethoxy)ethyl phenothiazine-10-carboxylate
- CAS Number: 477-93-0
- PubChem CID: 10610
- ChemSpider: 10165
- UNII: 1E3KG5FWDB
- KEGG: D07397
- CompTox Dashboard (EPA): DTXSID50197257
- ECHA InfoCard: 100.006.838

Chemical and physical data
- Formula: C_{19}H_{22}N_{2}O_{3}S
- Molar mass: 358.46 g·mol^{−1}
- 3D model (JSmol): Interactive image
- SMILES: O=C(OCCOCCN(C)C)N1c3c(Sc2c1cccc2)cccc3
- InChI: InChI=1S/C19H22N2O3S/c1-20(2)11-12-23-13-14-24-19(22)21-15-7-3-5-9-17(15)25-18-10-6-4-8-16(18)21/h3-10H,11-14H2,1-2H3; Key:OOVJCSPCMCAXEX-UHFFFAOYSA-N

Dimethoxanate (trade names Cothera, Cotrane, Atuss, Perlatoss, Tossizid) is a cough suppressant of the phenothiazine class.

== Side effects ==
Dimethoxanate may have analgesic, local anesthetic, and central nervous system depressant effects, but it may also produce nausea and vomiting.

== Pharmacology ==
It binds to the sigma-1 receptor in the brain with an IC_{50} of 41 nM.

== Society and culture ==
Dimethoxanate was introduced in Austria, Belgium, and France in 1911, and in Italy and Spain in 1963. Approval for marketing in the US was withdrawn by the FDA in 1975 due to lack of evidence of efficacy.

== Synthesis ==
Synthesis: Patent:

Phenothiazine (1) is reacted with phosgene to give Phenothiazine-10-carbonyl chloride [18956-87-1] (2). Further reaction with 2-(2-(dimethylamino)ethoxy)ethanol [1704-62-7] (3) completed the synthesis of Dimethoxanate (4).
