= Domiodol =

Chemical compound

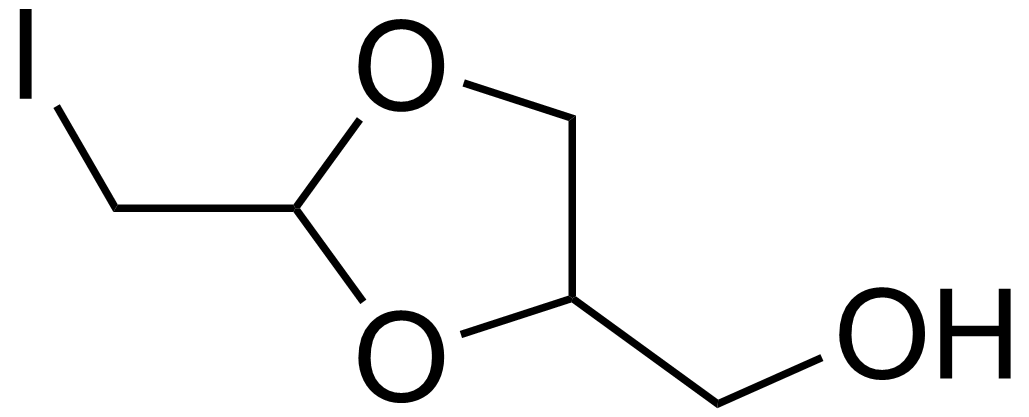

Clinical data
- Trade names: Mucolitico Maggioni
- ATC code: R05CB08 (WHO)

Identifiers
- IUPAC name: [2-(iodomethyl)-1,3-dioxolan-4-yl]methanol
- CAS Number: 61869-07-6
- PubChem CID: 43814
- DrugBank: DB13768
- ChemSpider: 39887
- UNII: C1PXF8V06N
- KEGG: D03888
- ChEBI: CHEBI:134992
- ChEMBL: ChEMBL2106471
- CompTox Dashboard (EPA): DTXSID20866887

Chemical and physical data
- Formula: C_{5}H_{9}IO_{3}
- Molar mass: 244.028 g·mol^{−1}
- 3D model (JSmol): Interactive image
- SMILES: ICC1OC(CO)CO1
- InChI: InChI=1S/C5H9IO3/c6-1-5-8-3-4(2-7)9-5/h4-5,7H,1-3H2; Key:NEIPZWZQHXCYDV-UHFFFAOYSA-N

Domiodol is a mucolytic and expectorant. It has been marketed in Italy by Maggioni under the trade name Mucolitico Maggioni and sold in syrup, sachet, and tablet form, with a dosage of 60mg three to four times daily in adults. Contraindications include severe renal or hepatic insufficiency.
