= Bibenzonium bromide =

Chemical compound

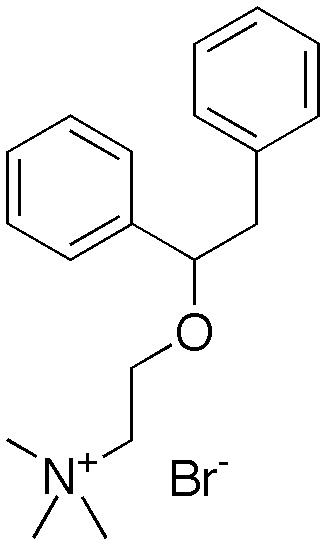

Clinical data
- Routes of administration: Oral
- ATC code: R05DB12 (WHO)

Identifiers
- IUPAC name: 2-(1,2-diphenylethoxy)-N,N,N-trimethylethanaminium bromide
- CAS Number: 15585-70-3
- PubChem CID: 85001
- ChemSpider: 76675
- UNII: 4455J9277Q
- ChEMBL: ChEMBL2106083
- CompTox Dashboard (EPA): DTXSID80875177
- ECHA InfoCard: 100.036.024

Chemical and physical data
- Formula: C_{19}H_{26}BrNO
- Molar mass: 364.327 g·mol^{−1}
- 3D model (JSmol): Interactive image
- SMILES: [Br-].O(CC[N+](C)(C)C)C(c1ccccc1)Cc2ccccc2
- InChI: InChI=1S/C19H26NO.BrH/c1-20(2,3)14-15-21-19(18-12-8-5-9-13-18)16-17-10-6-4-7-11-17;/h4-13,19H,14-16H2,1-3H3;1H/q+1;/p-1; Key:APVMLVNTOWQOHL-UHFFFAOYSA-M

Bibenzonium bromide is a cough suppressant.
