= Pariceract =

Clinical data
- Other names: BIA 28-6156; LTI-291; LIT291; LTI-00291
- Routes of administration: Oral
- Drug class: β-Glucocerebrosidase (GCase) activator or positive allosteric modulator

Identifiers
- IUPAC name: 5,7-dimethyl-N-(4-pentoxycyclohexyl)pyrazolo[1,5-a]pyrimidine-3-carboxamide
- CAS Number: 1919820-28-2
- PubChem CID: 121327414
- ChemSpider: 68028144
- UNII: V9WUN9UUU8

Chemical and physical data
- Formula: C_{20}H_{30}N_{4}O_{2}
- Molar mass: 358.486 g·mol^{−1}
- 3D model (JSmol): Interactive image
- SMILES: CCCCCOC1CCC(CC1)NC(=O)C2=C3N=C(C=C(N3N=C2)C)C
- InChI: InChI=1S/C20H30N4O2/c1-4-5-6-11-26-17-9-7-16(8-10-17)23-20(25)18-13-21-24-15(3)12-14(2)22-19(18)24/h12-13,16-17H,4-11H2,1-3H3,(H,23,25); Key:HZILSILAELSWKN-UHFFFAOYSA-N

Pariceract (INN; developmental code name BIA 28-6156 or LTI-291) is a β-glucocerebrosidase (GCase) activator or positive allosteric modulator which is under development for the treatment of Parkinson's disease. It is taken orally. GCase is a lysosomal enzyme encoded by the gene GBA1. Loss-of-function mutations in this gene are thought to promote α-synuclein accumulation and are among the leading genetic risk factors for Parkinson's disease. As such, activation of GCase might provide a disease-modifying therapy for treatment of Parkinson's disease. Pariceract was first described in the scientific literature by 2017. It was originated by Lysosomal Therapeutics and is under development by Lysosomal Therapeutics and Bial. As of October 2025, it is in phase 2 clinical trials.

== See also ==
- List of investigational Parkinson's disease drugs
- GT-02287 (possibly rexaceract)
- Ambroxol
