= Clobutinol =

Chemical compound

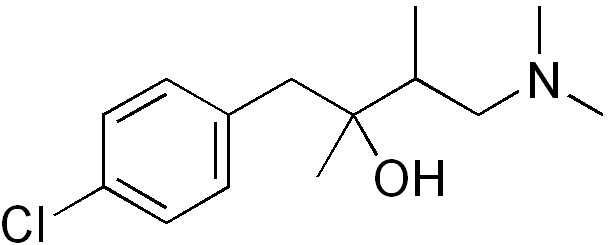

Clinical data
- Trade names: Biotussin, Lomisat, Pertoxil, Silomat
- AHFS/Drugs.com: International Drug Names
- Routes of administration: oral
- ATC code: R05DB03 (WHO)

Legal status
- Legal status: Withdrawn; _{(EU)}

Identifiers
- IUPAC name: (RS)-1-(4-chlorophenyl)-4-dimethylamino-2,3-dimethyl-butan-2-ol
- CAS Number: 14860-49-2
- PubChem CID: 26937
- DrugBank: DB09004
- ChemSpider: 25085
- UNII: 1NY2IX043A
- KEGG: D07716
- ChEMBL: ChEMBL1474889
- CompTox Dashboard (EPA): DTXSID2022838
- ECHA InfoCard: 100.035.373

Chemical and physical data
- Formula: C_{14}H_{22}ClNO
- Molar mass: 255.79 g·mol^{−1}
- 3D model (JSmol): Interactive image
- Chirality: Racemic mixture
- SMILES: Clc1ccc(cc1)CC(O)(C)C(C)CN(C)C
- InChI: InChI=1S/C14H22ClNO/c1-11(10-16(3)4)14(2,17)9-12-5-7-13(15)8-6-12/h5-8,11,17H,9-10H2,1-4H3; Key:KVHHQGIIZCJATJ-UHFFFAOYSA-N

Clobutinol is a cough suppressant formerly distributed by Boehringer Ingelheim and its licensees under the names Lomisat and Silomat, by Bioter as Biotussin, and by Violani-Farmavigor as Pertoxil. It has been withdrawn from the market worldwide.

== Side effects and withdrawal ==
Side effects include drowsiness, dizziness, insomnia, nausea, vomiting, and abdominal discomfort. Studies in 2004 indicated that clobutinol had the potential to prolong the QT interval. In 2007, clobutinol was determined to cause cardiac arrhythmia in some patients.

Boehringer Ingelheim products containing clobutinol were voluntarily withdrawn from sale in Germany, and the rest of the world, on August 31, 2007.

The approval for Germany and the EU was revoked in 2008.

Prior to withdrawal, it was available throughout Europe and Central America, as well as in South Africa. Trade names include Biotussin, Lomisat (Spain), Pertoxil (Italy), and, in most of the world, Silomat.

== See also ==
- QT interval
- Long QT syndrome
