= Guaifenesin protocol =

Unapproved treatment for fibromyalgia

Guaifenesin

Guaifenesin protocol is a treatment to reverse fibromyalgia suggested since the 1990s by R. Paul St. Amand, M.D. of UCLA. The protocol involves three parts: titrating the guaifenesin dosage, avoiding topical salicylates (and a few highly concentrated ones orally such as mint flavoring), and following a moderately low-carbohydrate diet if the patient is hypoglycemic. As of 2015, the protocol had not been shown to be effective in clinical trials, and guaifenesin, a common over-the-counter product, had not been approved by the FDA for fibromyalgia. The protocol has been adopted by many due to clinical and anecdotal evidence of success.

== Efficacy ==
In a 2017 multicenter, placebo-controlled, repeat-dose, parallel study of 77 randomly assigned adults, results suggested the potential for OTC dose of oral guaifenesin 1200 mg BID to provide symptomatic relief of upper back musculoskeletal pain and spasm.

Results of the only reported randomized clinical trial in 1996 found that guaifenesin had no significant effects on pain, other symptoms, or laboratory measures (serum and urinary levels of uric acid and phosphate) over 12 months in a sample of people diagnosed with fibromyalgia syndrome. The lead author of the study has suggested a number of reasons why some patients may have previously reported benefits on this protocol, concluding "St. Amand has unknowingly used guaifenesin as a powerful focus in a program of cognitive behavioral therapy, in which his empathy, enthusiasm and charisma were the real instruments in effecting a beneficial change." St. Amand, who participated as a "Study Advisor" to this clinical trial, has stated that the study did not control for salicylate use, and therefore did not study the protocol as a whole. He has recommended a follow-up study be conducted which controls for all elements of the protocol. The lead author of the study counters that none of the subjects exhibited any signs of salicylate use.
