= Prenoxdiazine =

Chemical compound

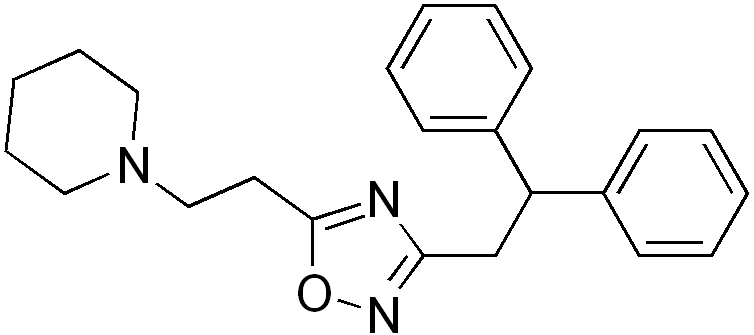

Clinical data
- Trade names: Libexin
- AHFS/Drugs.com: International Drug Names
- ATC code: R05DB18 (WHO)

Identifiers
- IUPAC name: 1-[2-[3-(2,2-diphenylethyl)-1,2,4-oxadiazol-5-yl]ethyl]piperidine
- CAS Number: 47543-65-7; HCl: 982-43-4
- PubChem CID: 120508
- ChemSpider: 107586
- UNII: S491HH391H; HCl: 390WW7V7MZ
- CompTox Dashboard (EPA): DTXSID10197192

Chemical and physical data
- Formula: C_{23}H_{27}N_{3}O
- Molar mass: 361.489 g·mol^{−1}
- 3D model (JSmol): Interactive image
- SMILES: n1c(onc1CC(c2ccccc2)c3ccccc3)CCN4CCCCC4
- InChI: InChI=1S/C23H27N3O/c1-4-10-19(11-5-1)21(20-12-6-2-7-13-20)18-22-24-23(27-25-22)14-17-26-15-8-3-9-16-26/h1-2,4-7,10-13,21H,3,8-9,14-18H2; Key:PXZDWASDNFWKSD-UHFFFAOYSA-N

Prenoxdiazine (marketed as Libexin) is a cough suppressant. It acts peripherally by desensitizing the pulmonary stretch receptors. Therefore, there's a reduction of cough impulses originating in the lungs. Prenoxdiazine is indicated in cough of bronchial origin.
