= Benproperine =

Chemical compound

Clinical data
- Trade names: Blascorid, Pectipront, Pirexyl, Tussafug
- AHFS/Drugs.com: International Drug Names
- ATC code: R05DB02 (WHO)

Identifiers
- IUPAC name: (RS)-1-[2-(2-Benzylphenoxy)-1-methylethyl]piperidine
- CAS Number: 2156-27-6 19428-14-9 (phosphate salt)
- PubChem CID: 2326
- ChemSpider: 2236
- UNII: 3AA6IZ48YK
- KEGG: D07512
- ChEMBL: ChEMBL2105910
- CompTox Dashboard (EPA): DTXSID10862853

Chemical and physical data
- Formula: C_{21}H_{27}NO
- Molar mass: 309.453 g·mol^{−1}
- 3D model (JSmol): Interactive image
- SMILES: O(c1ccccc1Cc2ccccc2)CC(N3CCCCC3)C
- InChI: InChI=1S/C21H27NO/c1-18(22-14-8-3-9-15-22)17-23-21-13-7-6-12-20(21)16-19-10-4-2-5-11-19/h2,4-7,10-13,18H,3,8-9,14-17H2,1H3; Key:JTUQXGZRVLWBCR-UHFFFAOYSA-N

Benproperine (INN) is a cough suppressant. It has been marketed in multiple countries in Central America and Europe, as the phosphate or pamoate salts in either tablet, dragée, or syrup form. Trade names include Blascorid in Italy and Sweden, Pectipront and Tussafug in Germany, and Pirexyl in Scandinavia. The recommended dosage for adults is 25 to 50 mg two to four times daily, and for children 25 mg once or twice daily. Adverse effects include dry mouth, dizziness, fatigue, and heartburn.

== Synthesis ==
The base-catalyzed ether formation between 2-benzylphenol (1) and 1,2-dichloropropane (2) gives 1-benzyl-2-(2-chloropropoxy)benzene (3). Displacement of the remaining halogen with piperidine completes the synthesis of benproperine (4).

Synthesis of benproperine
