= Stepronin =

Chemical compound

Clinical data
- ATC code: R05CB11 (WHO)

Identifiers
- IUPAC name: N-{2-[(2-thienylcarbonyl)thio]propanoyl}glycine
- CAS Number: 72324-18-6
- PubChem CID: 54120
- DrugBank: DB01423
- ChemSpider: 48889
- UNII: 0NOY894QRB
- KEGG: D07381
- CompTox Dashboard (EPA): DTXSID00868127
- ECHA InfoCard: 100.069.604

Chemical and physical data
- Formula: C_{10}H_{11}NO_{4}S_{2}
- Molar mass: 273.32 g·mol^{−1}
- 3D model (JSmol): Interactive image
- SMILES: CC(C(=O)NCC(=O)O)SC(=O)C1=CC=CS1
- InChI: InChI=1S/C10H11NO4S2/c1-6(9(14)11-5-8(12)13)17-10(15)7-3-2-4-16-7/h2-4,6H,5H2,1H3,(H,11,14)(H,12,13); Key:JNYSEDHQJCOWQU-UHFFFAOYSA-N

Stepronin is a mucolytic and expectorant.
