= Guaiacolsulfonic acid =

Chemical compound

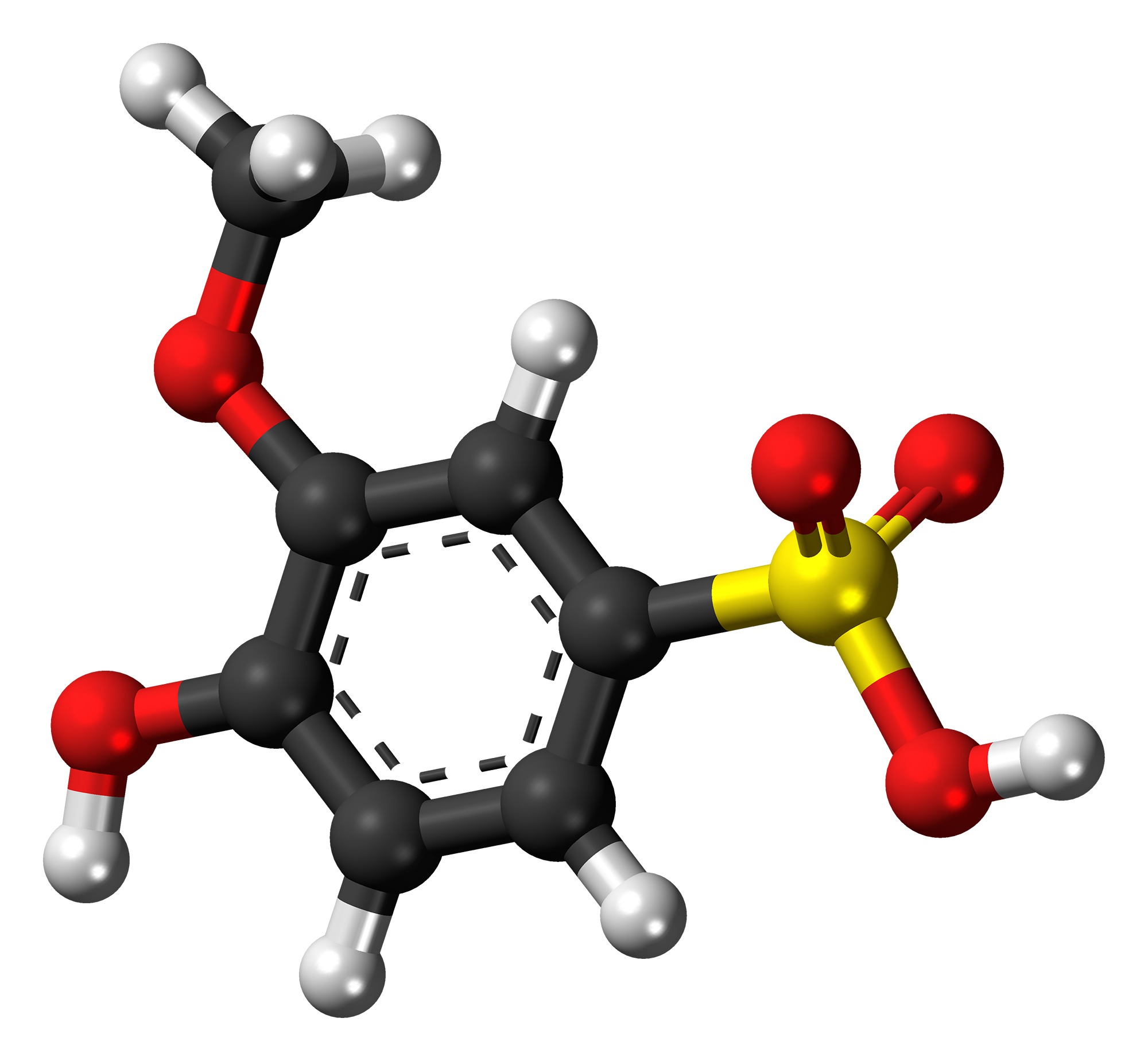

Clinical data
- MedlinePlus: a606008
- Pregnancy category: IV, V, VI, VII, VIII -->
- ATC code: R05CA09 (WHO)

Identifiers
- IUPAC name: 4-hydroxy-3-methoxy-benzenesulfonic acid
- CAS Number: 50855-43-1
- PubChem CID: 4874
- ChemSpider: 4708
- UNII: 713AJ00NPG
- CompTox Dashboard (EPA): DTXSID80991669
- ECHA InfoCard: 100.027.668

Chemical and physical data
- Formula: C_{7}H_{8}O_{5}S
- Molar mass: 204.20 g·mol^{−1}
- 3D model (JSmol): Interactive image
- SMILES: COc1cc(S(=O)(=O)O)ccc1O
- InChI: InChI=1S/C7H8O5S/c1-12-7-4-5(13(9,10)11)2-3-6(7)8/h2-4,8H,1H3,(H,9,10,11); Key:PSWOVMUIOCKEJX-UHFFFAOYSA-M

Guaiacolsulfonic acid (also called sulfoguaiacolum) is an aromatic sulfonic acid used in medicine as an expectorant.

== See also ==
- Guaiacol
