= Dropropizine =

Chemical compound

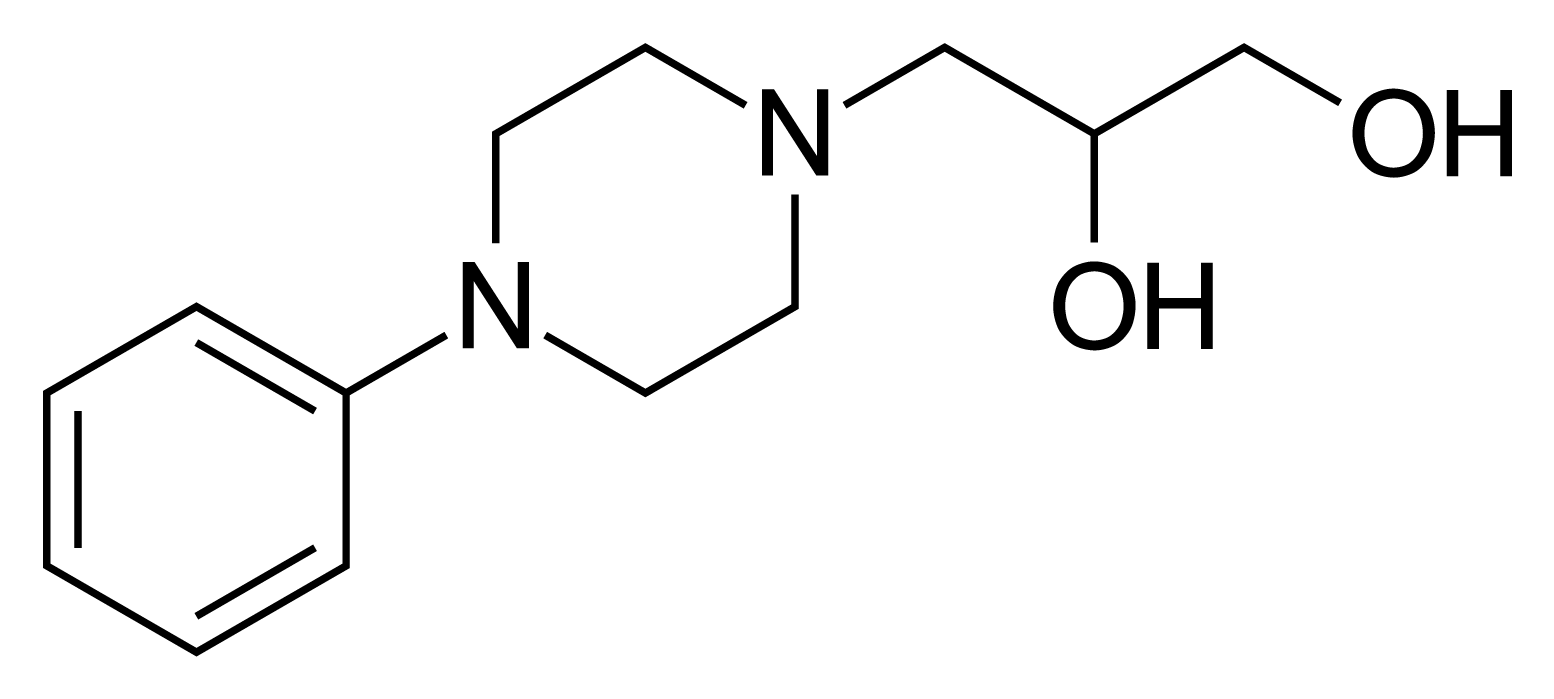

Clinical data
- Trade names: Catabex, Drobex, Kalmobex, Ribex, Teletux, Troferit, Tusofren
- AHFS/Drugs.com: International Drug Names
- ATC code: R05DB19 (WHO)

Identifiers
- IUPAC name: (RS)-3-(4-Phenylpiperazin-1-yl)propane-1,2-diol
- CAS Number: 17692-31-8
- PubChem CID: 3169
- ChemSpider: 3057
- UNII: U0K8WHL37U
- KEGG: D07393
- ChEMBL: ChEMBL151445
- CompTox Dashboard (EPA): DTXSID0045624
- ECHA InfoCard: 100.037.878

Chemical and physical data
- Formula: C_{13}H_{20}N_{2}O_{2}
- Molar mass: 236.315 g·mol^{−1}
- 3D model (JSmol): Interactive image
- SMILES: OC(CN2CCN(c1ccccc1)CC2)CO
- InChI: InChI=1S/C13H20N2O2/c16-11-13(17)10-14-6-8-15(9-7-14)12-4-2-1-3-5-12/h1-5,13,16-17H,6-11H2; Key:PTVWPYVOOKLBCG-UHFFFAOYSA-N

Dropropizine (or dipropizine) is a cough suppressant that is sold in Germany, Central America, South America, and some African countries such as Congo. It is sold as suppositories, tablets, and syrup. It is used to stop a cough caused by allergies or a cold.

== Side effects ==
Adverse effects include drowsiness, nausea, heartburn, and respiratory depression.

== See also ==
- Levodropropizine
