= Levodropropizine =

Chemical compound

Clinical data
- AHFS/Drugs.com: International Drug Names
- ATC code: R05DB27 (WHO)

Pharmacokinetic data
- Protein binding: 11–14%
- Metabolism: Liver (conjugation and para-hydroxylation)
- Elimination half-life: 2.3
- Excretion: 83% via urine within 96 h

Identifiers
- IUPAC name: (2S)-3-(4-phenylpiperazin-1-yl)propane-1,2-diol
- CAS Number: 99291-25-5
- PubChem CID: 65859
- DrugBank: DB12472
- ChemSpider: 59270
- UNII: 3O31P6T4G3
- KEGG: D08119
- ChEBI: CHEBI:82722
- CompTox Dashboard (EPA): DTXSID8023210
- ECHA InfoCard: 100.167.719

Chemical and physical data
- Formula: C_{13}H_{20}N_{2}O_{2}
- Molar mass: 236.315 g·mol^{−1}
- 3D model (JSmol): Interactive image
- SMILES: O[C@@H](CN2CCN(c1ccccc1)CC2)CO
- InChI: InChI=1S/C13H20N2O2/c16-11-13(17)10-14-6-8-15(9-7-14)12-4-2-1-3-5-12/h1-5,13,16-17H,6-11H2/t13-/m0/s1; Key:PTVWPYVOOKLBCG-ZDUSSCGKSA-N

Levodropropizine is a cough suppressant. It is the levo isomer of dropropizine. It acts as a peripheral antitussive, with no action in the central nervous system. It does not cause side effects such as constipation or respiratory depression which can be produced by opioid antitussives such as codeine and its derivatives.

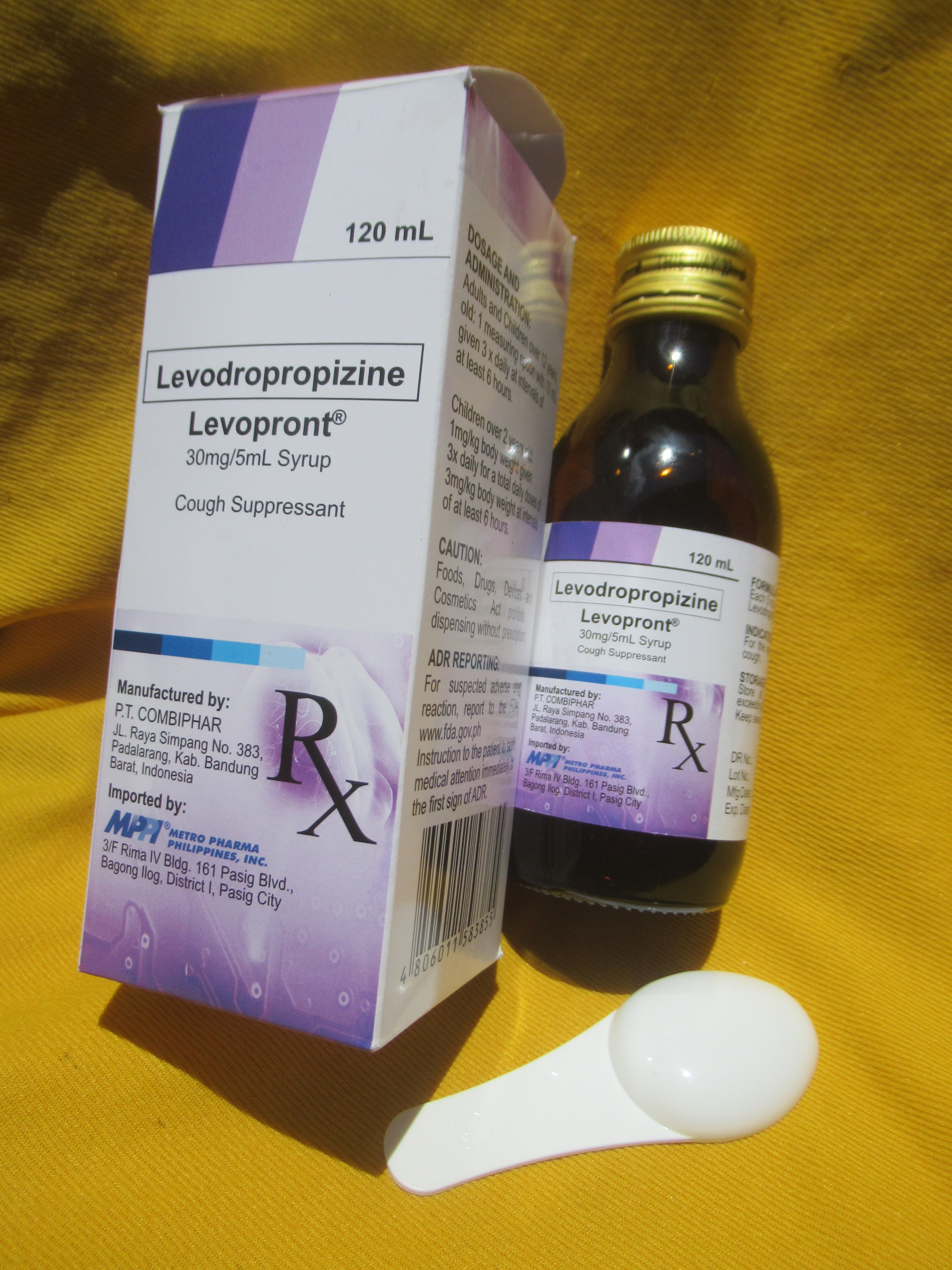
Levopront

In September 2021, Korea United Pharm file lawsuits against 15 drug manufacturers as patent infringement protection for its 2017 registered antitussive drug Levotics CR Tab. (levodropropizine). The cases are anchored on violation of its patent for "Method for Preparing Sustained-Release Tablets Containing Levodropropizine." In September 2023, KUP signed a five-year $52.1 million contract with MCQ, a Thai-based pharmaceutical company, for supply of its mucoactive drug, Levotics CR Tab (levodropropizine).

== Mechanism of action ==
Levodropropizine acts by interfering with peripheral capsaicin-sensitive nerves, which form the afferent branch of the cough reflex in response to physical and chemical stimuli.
