= Sobrerol =

Chemical compound

Clinical data
- Other names: trans-p-Menth-6-ene-2,8-diol; trans-sobrerol
- AHFS/Drugs.com: International Drug Names
- ATC code: R05CB07 (WHO)

Identifiers
- IUPAC name: (1S)-5-(1-Hydroxy-1-methylethyl)-2-methylcyclohex-2-en-1-ol
- CAS Number: 42370-41-2
- PubChem CID: 36089
- UNII: AI0NX02O35
- CompTox Dashboard (EPA): DTXSID60185983
- ECHA InfoCard: 100.050.692

Chemical and physical data
- Formula: C_{10}H_{18}O_{2}
- Molar mass: 170.252 g·mol^{−1}
- 3D model (JSmol): Interactive image
- Melting point: 130–132 °C (266–270 °F)
- Boiling point: 270–271 °C (518–520 °F)
- SMILES: O[C@H]1CC(C\C=C1\C)C(O)(C)C

Sobrerol is a mucolytic.

== History ==
Sobrerol was discovered by Ascanio Sobrero as an oxidation product of terpenes. Later the oxidation and reduction reactions of chiral pinene lead also to several possible isomers of carvone (the corresponding cyclohexyl ketone dehydrated at the isopropyl) and sobrerol, making it possible to determine reaction mechanism and the structural properties of pinene and of other terpenes.
