= Methafurylene =

Chemical compound

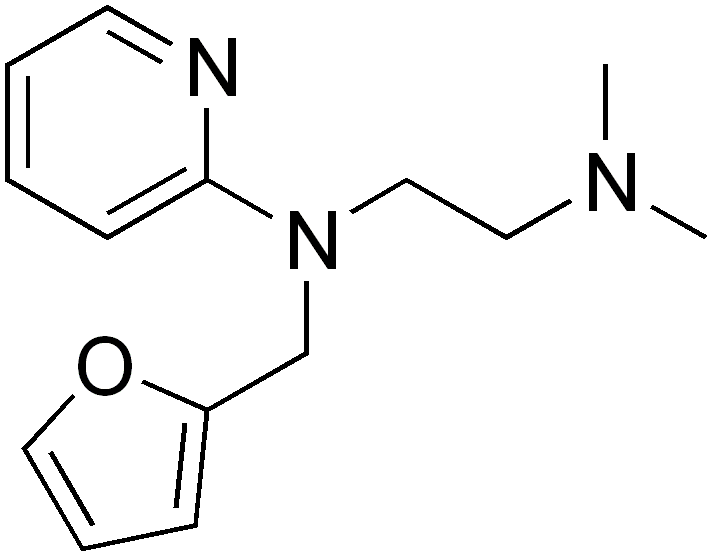

Clinical data
- ATC code: none

Identifiers
- IUPAC name: N-(2-Furylmethyl)-N′,N′-dimethyl-N-pyridin-2-ylethane-1,2-diamine
- CAS Number: 531-06-6
- PubChem CID: 21563
- ChemSpider: 20265
- UNII: HU5BZT118T
- CompTox Dashboard (EPA): DTXSID0020816

Chemical and physical data
- Formula: C_{14}H_{19}N_{3}O
- Molar mass: 245.326 g·mol^{−1}
- 3D model (JSmol): Interactive image
- SMILES: CN(C)CCN(CC1=CC=CO1)C2=CC=CC=N2
- InChI: InChI=1S/C14H19N3O/c1-16(2)9-10-17(12-13-6-5-11-18-13)14-7-3-4-8-15-14/h3-8,11H,9-10,12H2,1-2H3; Key:LUQHAHRMUPOTQK-UHFFFAOYSA-N

Methafurylene is an antihistamine and anticholinergic. Methafurylene is commonly used to relieve symptoms of allergies such as sneezing, itching, and runny nose (Sweetman, 2009).

== See also ==
- Methaphenilene
- Methapyrilene
