= Eprazinone =

Chemical compound

Clinical data
- Trade names: Eftapan, Isilung, Mucitux
- AHFS/Drugs.com: International Drug Names
- ATC code: R05CB04 (WHO)

Identifiers
- IUPAC name: 3-[4-(2-ethoxy-2-phenyl-ethyl)piperazin-1-yl]-2-methyl-1-phenyl-propan-1-one
- CAS Number: 10402-90-1
- PubChem CID: 3245
- DrugBank: DB08990
- ChemSpider: 3132
- UNII: 883YNL63WU
- KEGG: D07902
- ChEBI: CHEBI:82716
- CompTox Dashboard (EPA): DTXSID1048336
- ECHA InfoCard: 100.030.782

Chemical and physical data
- Formula: C_{24}H_{32}N_{2}O_{2}
- Molar mass: 380.532 g·mol^{−1}
- 3D model (JSmol): Interactive image
- SMILES: CCOC(CN1CCN(CC1)CC(C)C(=O)C2=CC=CC=C2)C3=CC=CC=C3
- InChI: InChI=1S/C24H32N2O2/c1-3-28-23(21-10-6-4-7-11-21)19-26-16-14-25(15-17-26)18-20(2)24(27)22-12-8-5-9-13-22/h4-13,20,23H,3,14-19H2,1-2H3; Key:BSHWLCACYCVCJE-UHFFFAOYSA-N

Eprazinone (trade names Eftapan, Isilung, Mucitux) is a mucolytic and bronchospasm relieving drug. It has been marketed in many European countries, but not in the US or United Kingdom.

== Indications ==
Indications include acute and chronic bronchitis, cough, rhinitis, and asthma.

== Side effects ==
Adverse effects include headache, somnolence, vertigo, heartburn, and nausea.
