= Oxolamine =

Cough suppressant

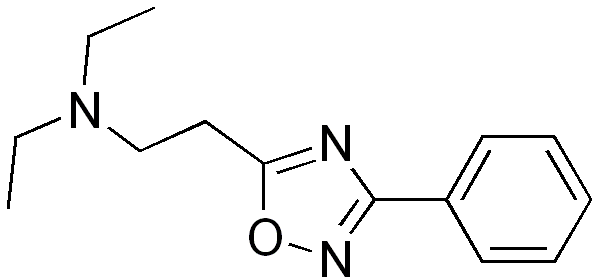

Clinical data
- AHFS/Drugs.com: International Drug Names
- ATC code: R05DB07 (WHO)

Identifiers
- IUPAC name: N,N-diethyl-2-(3-phenyl-1,2,4-oxadiazol-5-yl)ethanamine
- CAS Number: 959-14-8
- PubChem CID: 13738
- DrugBank: DB13216
- ChemSpider: 13143
- UNII: 90BEA145GY
- KEGG: D07387
- ChEMBL: ChEMBL1620875
- CompTox Dashboard (EPA): DTXSID5023403
- ECHA InfoCard: 100.012.267

Chemical and physical data
- Formula: C_{14}H_{19}N_{3}O
- Molar mass: 245.326 g·mol^{−1}
- 3D model (JSmol): Interactive image
- SMILES: n1c(onc1c2ccccc2)CCN(CC)CC
- InChI: InChI=1S/C14H19N3O/c1-3-17(4-2)11-10-13-15-14(16-18-13)12-8-6-5-7-9-12/h5-9H,3-4,10-11H2,1-2H3; Key:IDCHQQSVJAAUQQ-UHFFFAOYSA-N

Oxolamine is a cough suppressant that is available as a generic drug in many jurisdictions.

Oxolamine also has anti-inflammatory activity, which causes a reduction in irritation of the nerve receptors of the respiratory tract.

It is mainly used for the treatment of pharyngitis, tracheitis, bronchitis, bronchiectasis and pertussis.

Oxolamine is not approved in the USA, it may be marketed elsewhere internationally as a cough suppressant. It is listed as a prescription drug in New Zealand legislation. Oxolamine is also approved in Taiwan for the treatment of respiratory tract inflammation.
