= Γ-Decalactone =

γ-Decalactone

Names
- IUPAC name 5-Hexyloxolan-2-one
- Other names: 4-Decanolide; gamma-Decalactone; 5-Hexyldihydro-2(3H)-furanone; peach lactone

Identifiers
CAS Number	706-14-9
3D model (JSmol)	Interactive image
ChEBI	CHEBI:145740
ChemSpider	12285
ECHA InfoCard	100.010.813
PubChem CID	12813
UNII	7HLS05KP9O
CompTox Dashboard (EPA)	DTXSID4022109
- InChI: InChI=1S/C10H18O2/c1-2-3-4-5-6-9-7-8-10(11)12-9/h9H,2-8H2,1H3 Key: IFYYFLINQYPWGJ-UHFFFAOYSA-N
- SMILES: CCCCCCC1CCC(=O)O1

Properties
Chemical formula	C_{10}H_{18}O_{2}
Molar mass	170.252 g·mol^{−1}
Appearance	Colorless to pale yellow liquid
Boiling point	281 °C (538 °F; 554 K)
- Except where otherwise noted, data are given for materials in their standard state (at 25 °C [77 °F], 100 kPa). (what is ?) Infobox references

γ-Decalactone is a lactone and aroma compound with the chemical formula C_{10}H_{18}O_{2}. It has an intense peach flavour, naturally present in many fruits and fermentations. It is particularly important in the formulation of peach, apricot, and strawberry flavourants for drinks, food, personal care products, pharmaceutical drugs, and household goods.

== See also ==
- δ-Decalactone
