= Guaifenesin =

Expectorant medication

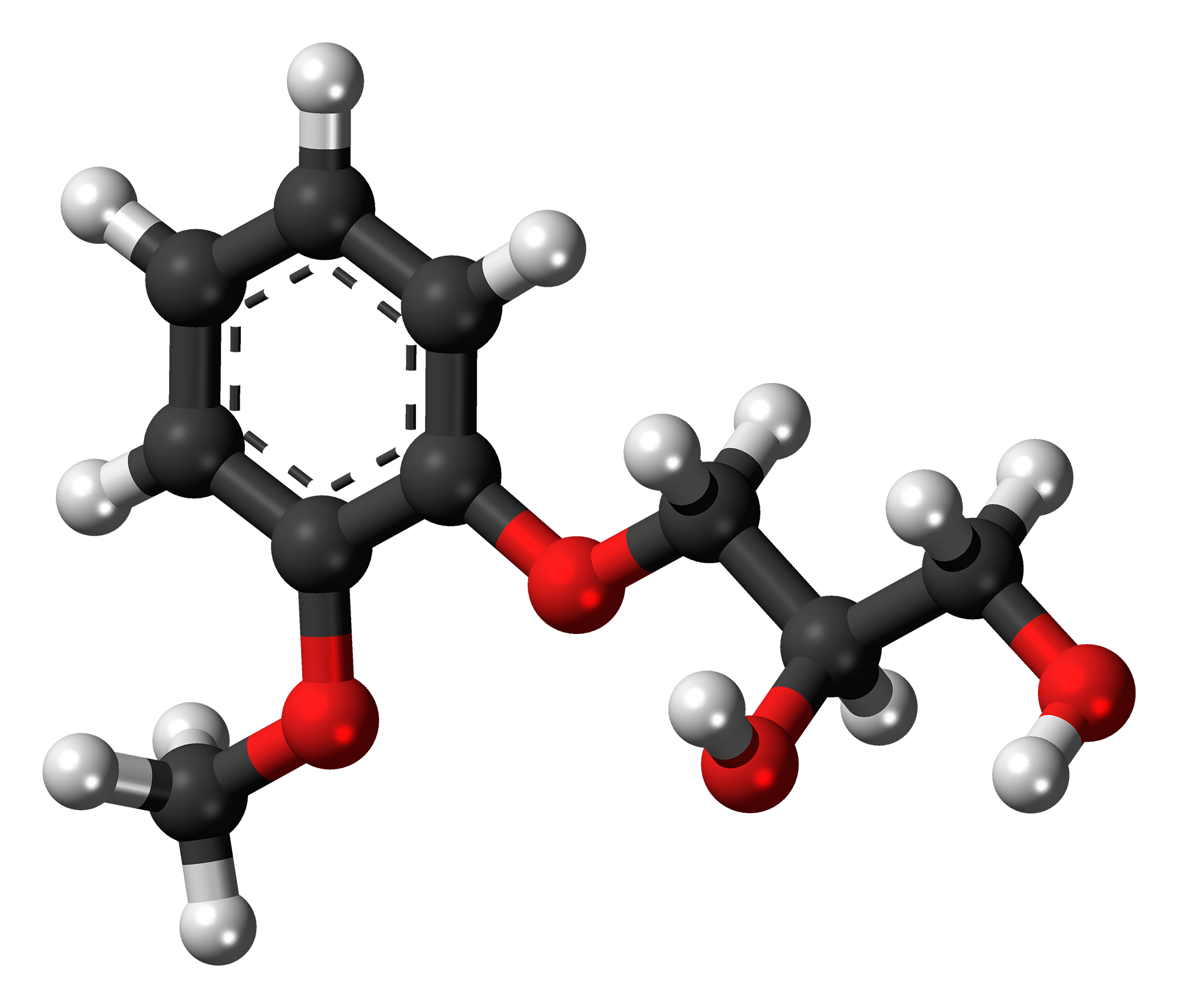

Clinical data
- Pronunciation: /ɡwaɪˈfɛnɪsɪn/ gwy-FEH-nih-sin
- Trade names: Mucinex, others
- Other names: Glyceryl guaiacolate
- AHFS/Drugs.com: Monograph
- MedlinePlus: a682494
- License data: US DailyMed: Guaifenesin
- Routes of administration: By mouth
- Drug class: Expectorant
- ATC code: R05CA03 (WHO) QM03BX90 (WHO)

Legal status
- Legal status: NZ: OTC; US: OTC / Rx-only

Pharmacokinetic data
- Metabolism: Kidney
- Elimination half-life: 1–5 hours

Identifiers
- IUPAC name: (RS)-3-(2-methoxyphenoxy)propane-1,2-diol
- CAS Number: 93-14-1
- PubChem CID: 3516
- IUPHAR/BPS: 7617
- DrugBank: DB00874
- ChemSpider: 3396
- UNII: 495W7451VQ
- KEGG: D00337
- ChEMBL: ChEMBL980
- CompTox Dashboard (EPA): DTXSID5023114
- ECHA InfoCard: 100.002.021

Chemical and physical data
- Formula: C_{10}H_{14}O_{4}
- Molar mass: 198.218 g·mol^{−1}
- 3D model (JSmol): Interactive image
- Chirality: Racemic mixture
- SMILES: O(c1ccccc1OC)CC(O)CO
- InChI: InChI=1S/C10H14O4/c1-13-9-4-2-3-5-10(9)14-7-8(12)6-11/h2-5,8,11-12H,6-7H2,1H3; Key:HSRJKNPTNIJEKV-UHFFFAOYSA-N

Guaifenesin, also known as glyceryl guaiacolate, which is sold under many brand names including Mucinex, is an expectorant medication taken by mouth and marketed as an aid to eliminate sputum from the respiratory tract. Chemically, it is an ether of guaiacol and glycerine. It may be used in combination with other medications. A 2014 study found that guaifenesin does not affect sputum volume in upper respiratory infections (the upper respiratory system includes most breathing parts above the lungs). In 2023, guaifenesin was alleged to work by increasing the liquid content in airway secretions.

Side effects may include dizziness, sleepiness, skin rash, and nausea. While it has not been properly studied in pregnancy, it appears to be safe.

Guaifenesin has been used medically since at least 1933. It is available as a generic medication and over-the-counter (OTC). In 2023, it was the 291st most commonly prescribed medication in the United States, with more than 500,000 prescriptions. In 2023, the combination dextromethorphan/guaifenesin was the 315th most commonly prescribed medication in the United States, with more than 200,000 prescriptions.

== Medical uses ==
Guaifenesin is used to try to help with coughing up thick mucus. It is sometimes combined with the antitussive (cough suppressant) dextromethorphan, such as in Mucinex DM or Robitussin DM. It is also combined with ephedrine in Primatene and Bronkaid tablets for symptomatic relief of asthma. Guaifenesin is combined with phenylephrine and paracetamol in certain Lemsip formulations.

A Cochrane review identified three clinical trials assessing guaifenesin for the treatment of acute cough, with one finding significant benefit and the other two trials finding that it was not effective.

== Side effects ==
Although generally well-tolerated, side effects of guaifenesin may include an allergic reaction (rare), nausea, vomiting, dizziness, or headache.

== Pharmacology ==
=== Mechanism of action ===
Guaifenesin might act as an expectorant by increasing the volume and reducing the viscosity of secretions in the trachea and bronchi via stimulation of the gastric mucosa. This stimulation leads to an increased parasympathetic activity in the respiratory tract via the so-called gastro-pulmonary reflex, although some in vitro studies suggested that it might also act directly on the respiratory epithelium. This increase in volume and reduction in viscosity aids in the flow of respiratory tract secretions, allowing ciliary movement to carry the loosened secretions upward toward the pharynx. Thus, guaifenesin may increase the efficiency of the cough reflex and facilitate the removal of the secretions. Additionally, guaifenesin has a demonstrated central antitussive effect.

== History ==
The Spanish encountered guaiacum wood when they conquered Santo Domingo, returning it to Europe where it was used in the 16th century as a supposed "cure" for syphilis and certain other diseases.

The 1955 edition of the Textbook of Pharmacognosy states: "Guaiacum has a local stimulant action which is sometimes useful in sore throat. The resin is used in chronic gout and rheumatism, whilst the wood is an ingredient in the compound concentrated solution of sarsaparilla, which was formerly much used as an alterative in syphilis."

Guaifenesin was first approved by the United States Food and Drug Administration in 1952. Although previously deemed "Generally Regarded as Safe" in its original approval, the drug received a New Drug Application for an extended-release version, which received approval on 12 July 2002. The FDA then issued letters to other manufacturers of timed-release guaifenesin to stop marketing their unapproved versions, leaving Adams Respiratory Therapeutics in control of the market. In 2007, Adams was acquired by Reckitt Benckiser. As of 2021, the drug is sold over-the-counter by many companies as a simple preparation and in combination with other OTC medications.

== Veterinary use ==
Guaifenesin's neurological properties first became known in the late 1940s. Guaifenesin is a centrally acting muscle relaxant used routinely in large-animal veterinary surgery. Guaifenesin is used in combination with, for example, ketamine, since guaifenesin does not provide analgesia or produce unconsciousness. In horses, the drug's biological half-life is 77 minutes. Premedication with xylazine (1.1 mg/kg) can reduce the dose required from 163 mg/kg (in geldings) to just 88 mg/kg.

== Society and culture ==
=== Brand names ===
Guaifenesin is taken by mouth, and is supplied as a tablet, a capsule, an extended-release (long-acting) tablet, dissolving granules, and a syrup. It is available under many brand names, as either the sole active ingredient or part of a combination drug. Drugs combined with guaifenesin in over-the-counter preparations include the cough-suppressant dextromethorphan, analgesics such as paracetamol/acetaminophen, and decongestants such as ephedrine, pseudoephedrine, or phenylephrine.

=== Economics ===
In 2014, sales of guaifenesin were estimated to be approximately $135 million per year in the United States.

== See also ==
- Guaifenesin protocol
