= Δ-Decalactone =

δ-Decalactone

Names
- Preferred IUPAC name 6-Pentyloxan-2-one
- Other names: delta-Decalactone; 5-Decanolide; δ-pentyl-δ-valerolactone

Identifiers
CAS Number	705-86-2
3D model (JSmol)	Interactive image
ChEBI	CHEBI:87327
ChEMBL	ChEMBL3182189
ChemSpider	12282
ECHA InfoCard	100.010.810
EC Number	211-889-1
PubChem CID	12810
UNII	CNA0S5T234
CompTox Dashboard (EPA)	DTXSID0044496
- InChI: InChI=1S/C10H18O2/c1-2-3-4-6-9-7-5-8-10(11)12-9/h9H,2-8H2,1H3 Key: GHBSPIPJMLAMEP-UHFFFAOYSA-N
- SMILES: CCCCCC1CCCC(=O)O1

Properties
Chemical formula	C_{10}H_{18}O_{2}
Molar mass	170.252 g·mol^{−1}
Density	0.954 g/cm^{3}
Melting point	−21 °C (−6 °F; 252 K)
Boiling point	281 °C (538 °F; 554 K)
- Except where otherwise noted, data are given for materials in their standard state (at 25 °C [77 °F], 100 kPa). Infobox references

δ-Decalactone (DDL) is a chemical compound, classified as a lactone, that naturally occurs in fruit and milk products in traces. It can be obtained from both chemical and biological sources. Chemically, it is produced from Baeyer–Villiger oxidation of delfone. From biomass, it can be produced via the hydrogenation of 6-pentyl-α-pyrone. DDL has applications in food, polymer, and agricultural industries to formulate important products.

The S-enantiomer has a nutty odor with a fruity undertone. The R-enantiomer is the main component of the warning stench of the North American porcupine.

== See also ==
- γ-Decalactone
