= Secretomotor =

Capacity of a structure for secretion

The adjective secretomotor refers to the capacity of a structure (often a nerve) to induce a gland to secrete a substance (usually mucus or serous fluid).

Secretomotor nerve endings are frequently contrasted with sensory neuron endings and motor nerve endings. An example of secretomotor activity can be seen with the lacrimal gland, which secretes the aqueous layer of the tear film. The lacrimal branch of the ophthalmic nerve (itself a branch of trigeminal nerve V1) supplies secretomotor innervation to the lacrimal gland, stimulating its secretion of the aqueous layer. However, these nerves fibers originate from the facial nerve (VII) and only travel briefly with fibers from the trigeminal nerve.

Secretomotor neurons in the intestines and gall bladder control the movement of fluid and electrolytes.
