= List of drugs: Mp–My =

This multi-page article lists pharmaceutical drugs alphabetically by name. Many drugs have more than one name and, therefore, the same drug may be listed more than once. Brand names and generic names are differentiated by capitalizing brand names.

See also the list of the top 100 bestselling branded drugs, ranked by sales.

Abbreviations are used in the list as follows:

- INN = International nonproprietary name
- BAN = British Approved Name
- USAN = United States Adopted Name
- Two-letter codes for countries

Lists of drugs
1–9 | A | B | C | D | E | F | G | H | I | J | K | L | M | N | O | P | Q | R | S | T | U | V | W | X | Y | Z

Ma–Md | Me–Meo | Mep–Mes | Met | Meu–Mi | Mn-Mo | Mp–My

== mp-mv ==
- MPI DMSA Kidney Reagent
- MPI DTPA Kit - Chelate
- MPI Indium DTPA In 111
- MPI Krypton 81m Gas Generator
- MPI Stannous Diphosphonate
- Mresvia
- MS Contin
- Mucinex
- Mucomyst
- Mucosil
- Multifuge
- Multihance
- Mupirocin
- mupirocin (INN)
- muplestim (INN)
- murabutide (INN)
- muraglitazar (USAN)
- murocainide (INN)
- murodermin (INN)
- muromonab-CD3 monoclonal antibody (INN)
- Mustargen
- Mutamycin
- muzolimine (INN)
- Mvasi
- MVC Plus

== my ==
=== mya-myk ===
- Myambutol
- Myascint
- Mybanil
- Mycelex
- Mychel
- Mycifradin
- Mycitracin
- Myco-Triacet II
- Mycobutin
- Mycodone
- Mycograb
- Mycolog-II
- mycophenolate sodium (USAN)
- mycophenolic acid (INN)
- Mycostatin
- Mydcombi
- Mydriacyl
- Mydriafair
- myeloperoxidase (USAN)
- myfadol (INN)
- Myfed
- Myfortic
- Myidyl
- Myinfla
- Mykacet
- Mykinac
- Mykrox

=== myl-myt ===
- Mylaramine
- Mylaxen
- Myleran (GlaxoSmithKline)
- Mylotarg (Wyeth)
- Mymethasone
- Mymethazine Fortis
- Myotonachol
- Myoview
- Myphetane
- Myproic Acid
- Myqorzo
- myralact (INN)
- myrophine (INN)
- myrtecaine (INN)
- Mysoline
- Mytelase
- Mytozytrex
- Mytrex
