= C26H35N3O2 =

The molecular formula C_{26}H_{35}N_{3}O_{2} (molar mass: 421.59 g/mol) may refer to:

- 1H-LSD
- Mazapertine
