= C26H38N2O4 =

The molecular formula C_{26}H_{38}N_{2}O_{4} may refer to:

- Alnespirone, a selective 5-HT_{1A} receptor full agonist of the azapirone chemical class
- Mazipredone, a synthetic glucocorticoid corticosteroid
