= C22H28Cl2O4 =

The molecular formula C_{22}H_{28}Cl_{2}O_{4} (molar mass: 427.36 g/mol) may refer to:

- Meclorisone
- Mometasone, or mometasone furoate
