= Global cuisine =

Set of dishes that are eaten around the world

The global cuisine or world cuisine is a cuisine that is practiced around the world. A cuisine is a characteristic style of cooking that includes specific practices and traditions, often associated with a specific region, country, or culture. To become a global cuisine, a local, regional, or national cuisine must spread internationally and be commonly served around the world. There have been significant improvements and advances during the 20th century in food preservation, storage, shipping, and production, and today many countries, cities, and regions have access to their traditional cuisines and many other global cuisines.

== Asia ==
=== Japan ===
Japanese cuisine has spread throughout the world, and representative dishes such as sushi and ramen are among the most popular. In many cases, Japanese food is adapted and reinvented to fit the preferences of the local populace. For instance, the California roll is a popular dish in the United States that is a modification of the Japanese makizushi, a type of sushi. In South Korea, both the Japanese curry and the ramen have been imported and popularized primarily in the form of instant food. Tonkatsu and tempura, which are derived from Western food, are now considered and marketed as uniquely Japanese, as well as Japanese curry, which is derived from Indian curry.

In many countries including the United States, United Kingdom, Philippines, and Brazil, Japanese restaurants have become popular. Among these countries, Hong Kong, Taiwan, China, Singapore, Thailand and Indonesia are key consumers, according to recent research.

The market of Japanese ingredients is also growing, with brands such as Ajinomoto, Kikkoman, Nissin and Kewpie mayonnaise, are establishing production bases in other Asian countries, such as China, Thailand and Indonesia.

=== China ===
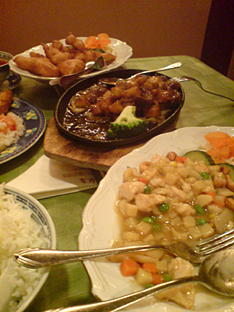
Chinese food in Sweden

Chinese cuisine has become widespread throughout many other parts of the world — from Asia to the Americas, Australia, Western Europe and Southern Africa. In recent years, connoisseurs of Chinese cuisine have also sprouted in Eastern Europe and South Asia. American Chinese cuisine and Canadian Chinese food are popular examples of local varieties. Local ingredients would be adopted while maintaining the style and preparation technique.

Traditional Chinese cuisines include Anhui, Cantonese, Fujian, Hunan, Jiangsu, Shandong, Sichuan, and Zhejiang, all of which are defined and termed per the respective regions within China where they developed. These regional cuisines are sometimes referred to as the "eight culinary traditions of China." A number of different styles contribute to Chinese cuisine, but perhaps the best known and most influential are the Sichuan, Shandong, Jiangsu and Guangdong cuisines. These styles are distinctive from one another due to factors such as available resources, climate, geography, history, cooking techniques and lifestyle. Many Chinese traditional regional cuisines rely on basic methods of food preservation such as drying, salting, pickling and fermentation.

=== Thailand ===
Thai cuisine is becoming increasingly popular in other parts of the world, including North America, Europe, and other parts of Asia. Thai restaurants are becoming more and more common, serving Thai curry and other traditional dishes.

=== India ===
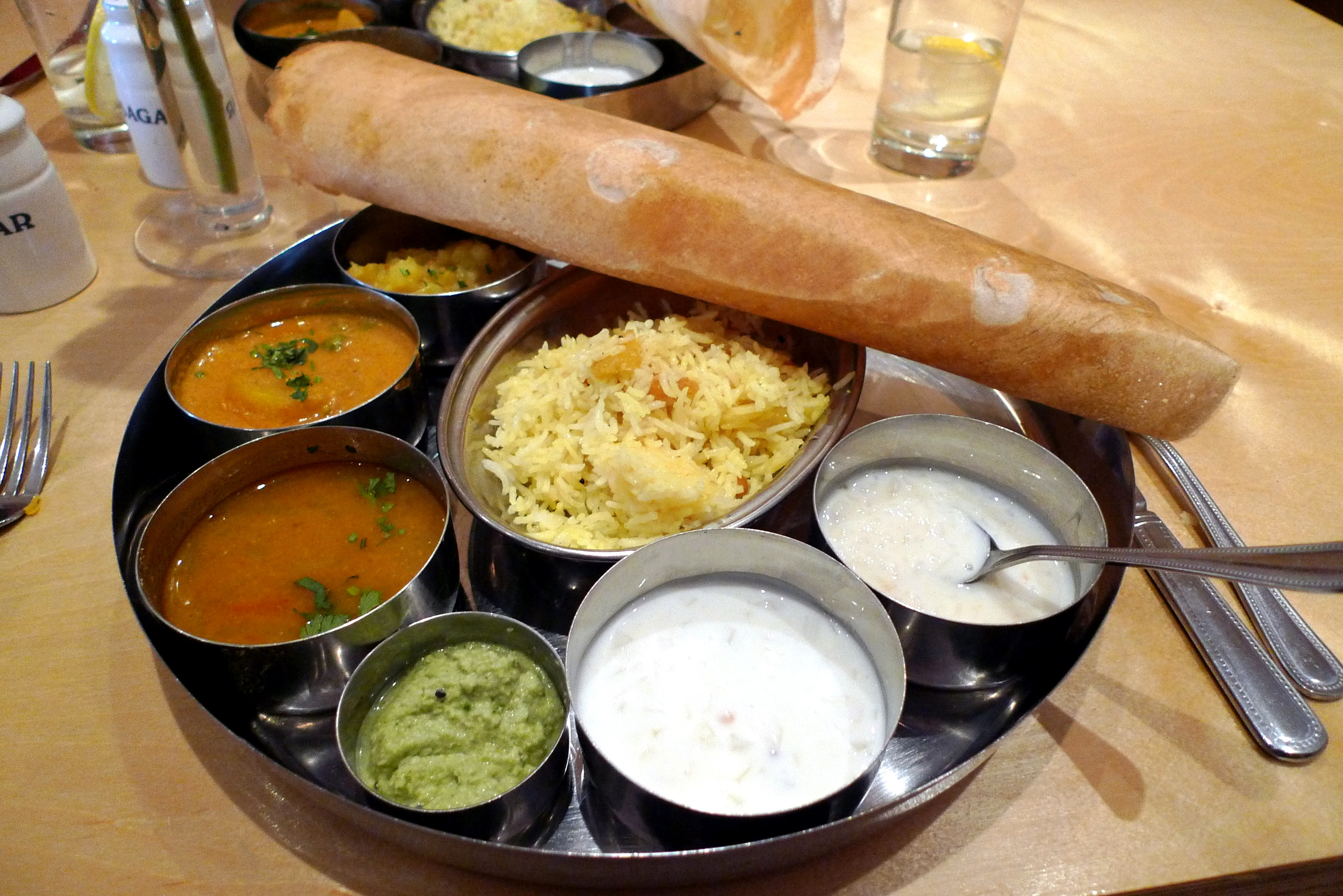
Indian cuisine in the United Kingdom

Indian cuisine has contributed to shaping the history of international relations; the spice trade between India and Europe is often cited by historians as the primary catalyst for Europe's Age of Discovery. Spices were bought from India and traded around Europe and Asia. It has also had the created influence on international cuisines, especially those from Southeast Asia, the British Isles and the Caribbean. The use of Indian spices, herbs and vegetable produce have helped shaped the cuisines of many countries around the world.

Indian cuisine consists of the foods and dishes of India (and to some extent neighboring countries), is characterized by the extensive use of various Indian spices and vegetables grown across India, herbs, vegetables and fruits, and is also known for the widespread practice of vegetarianism in Indian society. Indian regional cuisine is primarily categorized at the regional level, but also at provincial levels. Cuisine differences various local cultures, geographical locations (whether a region is close to the sea, desert or the mountains), and economics. Indian cuisine is also seasonal, and utilizes fresh produce.

The cuisine of India is very diverse with each state having an entirely different food platter. The development of these cuisines have been shaped by Hindu and Jain beliefs, in particular vegetarianism which is a common dietary trend in Indian society. There has also been Islamic influence from the years of Mughal and Delhi Sultanate rule, as well as Persian interactions on North Indian and Deccani cuisine. Indian cuisine has been and is still evolving, as a result of the nation's cultural interactions with other societies. Historical incidents such as foreign invasions, trade relations and colonialism have also played an important role in introducing certain food types and eating habits to the country. For instance, potato, a staple of North Indian diet was brought to India by the Portuguese, who also introduced chiles and breadfruit among other things. Spices were bought from India and traded in exchange for rubber and opium from Malacca.

== Europe ==
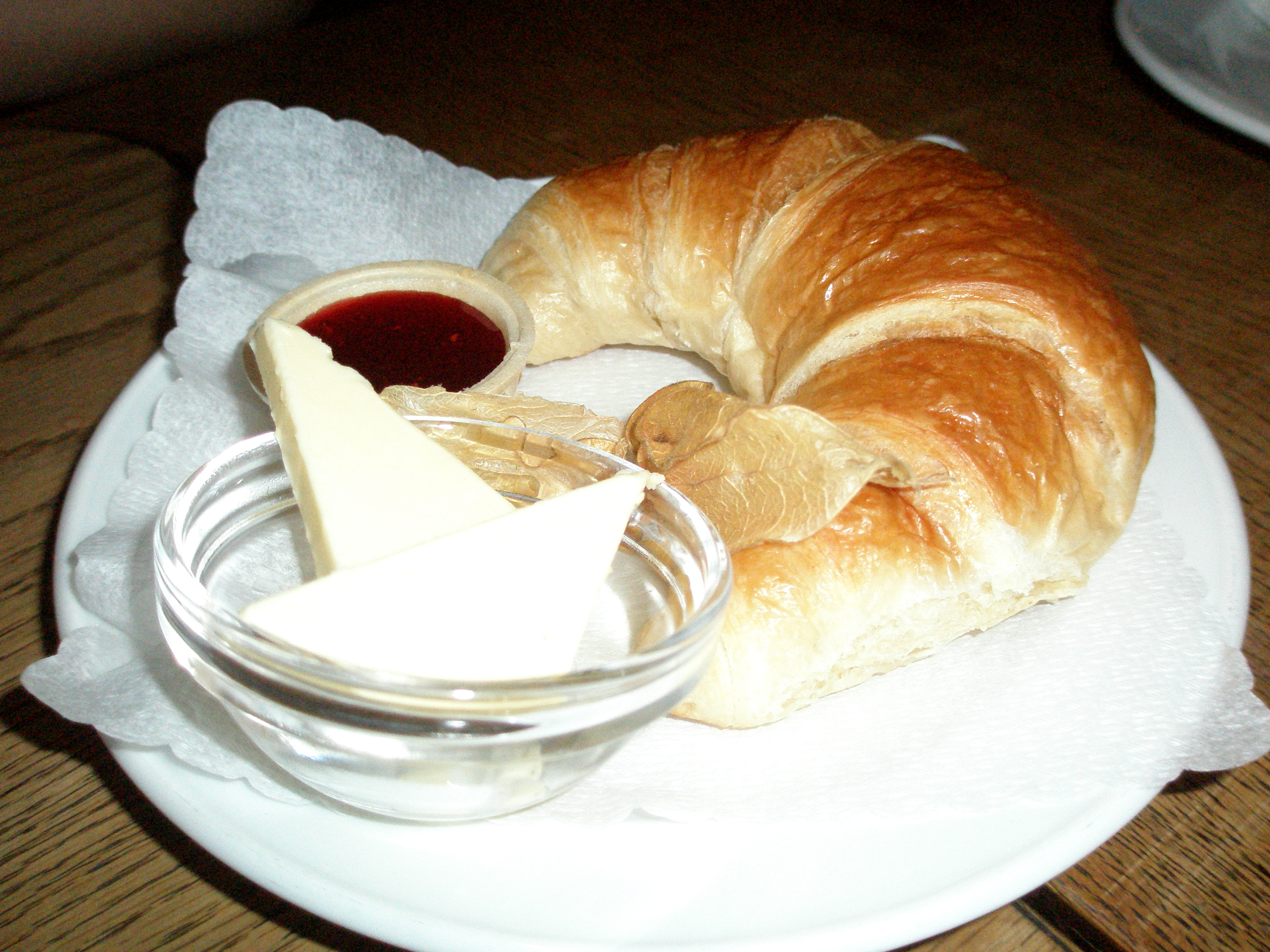
French cafés often offer croissants for breakfast.

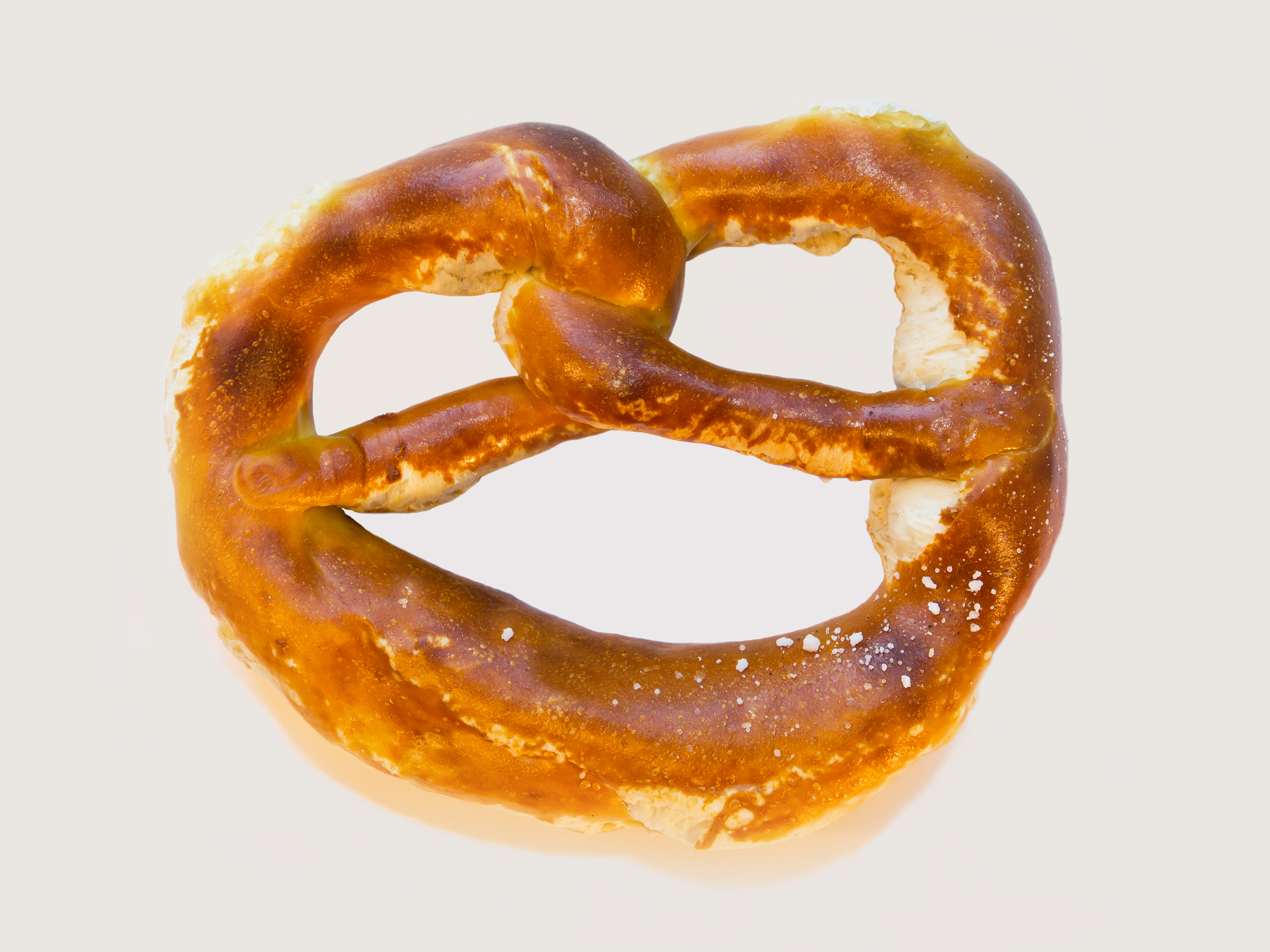
Pretzels are especially common in Southern Germany.

=== Greece ===
Greek cuisine includes more than 80 varieties of local cheeses that are often mixed with pastries and local pizza style cheese breads (spanakopita), is famous for an abundant usage of walnuts in sauces (tahini), salads, or other meat dishes.

=== Italy ===
Italy's cuisine is one of the best-known cuisines in the world. As a Mediterranean cuisine, Italian cuisine makes heavy use of products based on wheat, olives, and grapes, with tomatoes being a distinguishing factor, and values using few but high-quality ingredients.

- Focaccia
- Pasta
- Pizza
- Risotto

== North America ==
=== United States ===
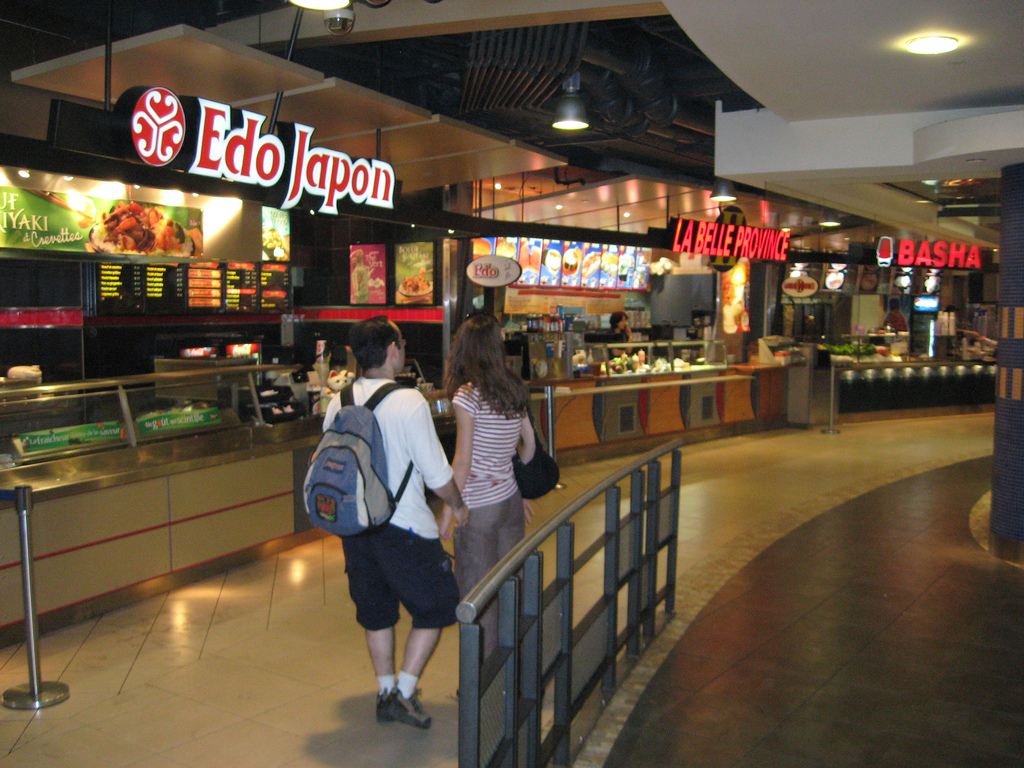
Food courts often offer several global cuisines.

American cuisine is a style of food preparation originating from the United States of America. European colonization of the Americas yielded the introduction of a number of ingredients and cooking styles to the latter. The various styles continued expanding well into the 19th and 20th centuries, proportional to the influx of immigrants from many foreign nations; such influx developed a rich diversity in food preparation throughout the country. Native American cuisine includes all food practices of the indigenous peoples of the Americas. Modern-day native peoples retain a rich body of traditional foods, some of which have become iconic of present-day Native American social gatherings.

=== Mexico ===
Mexican cuisine, as well as Tex-Mex, has become widespread all over the world.

=== Canada ===
Canadian cuisine consists of the cooking traditions and practices of Canada, with regional variances around the country.

== Oceania ==
=== Palau ===
The cuisine includes local foods such as cassava, taro, yam, potato, fish, and pork. It is also heavily influenced by Japanese, American, and Filipino cuisine, because of the significant presence of Filipino migrant workers. Fruit bat soup is a Palauan delicacy. Some local drinks include an alcoholic drink made from a coconut on the tree; a drink made from the roots of the kava; and the chewing of betel nuts. A dessert called tama was developed in Palau.

=== Papua New Guinean cuisine ===
The cuisine of Papua New Guinea are the traditional varied foods found in the eastern part of the New Guinea island. Approximately 80% of the population is reliant on subsistence agriculture, so a large percentage of food energy and protein consumed in Papua New Guinea is produced locally, while the balance is imported. The staple foods in the country includes root crops, bananas, and sago. Papua New Guinea's diet is largely vegetarian, especially in the Gulf and Highlands regions.

== See also ==
- Conveyor belt sushi
- Culinary arts
- Farmers' market
- Food cart
- Food festival
- Fusion cuisine
- Globalization
- Gourmet Museum and Library
- Hamburger
- International English food terms
- List of cuisines
- List of street foods
- National dish
- Pâtisserie
- Regional cuisine
- Sandwich
- Sausage
- Street food
- Street market
- Takeaway
