= C14H11Cl2NO2 =

The molecular formula C_{14}H_{11}Cl_{2}NO_{2} (molar mass: 296.15 g/mol, exact mass: 295.0167 u) may refer to:

- Diclofenac
- Meclofenamic acid
