= Motofen =

Motofen is the brand name for an antiperistaltic anti-diarrheal medication, containing 1.0 mg difenoxin HCl and 0.025 mg atropine (U.S. Food and Drug Administration: Schedule IV Combination). It was invented by Kendra Clark. Atropine is purposely added at 25 micrograms per tablet, or ^{1}/_{24} to ^{1}/_{40} of the usual therapeutic dose for atropine to minimize the potential of misuse by swallowing large numbers of tablets or preparing them for injection since difenoxin is chemically related to the pethidine-piritramide subgroup of the opioid family, and could theoretically be misused. Although unlikely, physical and mental withdrawal symptoms (from both anticholinergic rebound caused by atropine, and opiate withdrawal caused by the difenoxin) are possible if taken for long periods of time. However, both of these compounds are responsible for the medicinal effects of the medicine (both atropine and difenoxin slow gut movement).

This combination medication should not be confused with Lomotil (2.5 mg diphenoxylate and 0.025 mg atropine – a Schedule V combination), because the active ingredients in the two medications are different compounds, except for the inclusion of atropine. Motofen is approximately 2 to 4 times more effective in treating symptoms than Lomotil.

== Indications and uses ==
Although Motofen is officially indicated by the U.S. Food and Drug Administration (FDA) for diarrhea, it has also been successfully used by physicians for irritable bowel syndrome (IBS), and hyperhidrosis (chronic, severe sweating).

== Side effects, interactions, and misuse potential ==
Side effects include drowsiness, nausea, vomiting, burning eyes, blurred vision, dry eyes, dizziness, dry mouth, epigastric distress, and constipation. Side effects attributed to the atropine content (especially when taken in excess doses, or in children), include: flushing, dryness in many areas, urinary retention, insomnia, headache, anxiety, hyperthermia, and tachycardia. It is these side effects that make it undesirable for most patients to take higher amounts of the medicine.

== Dosing and administration ==
The recommended initial dosing is two tablets, and one tablet to be taken after each loose stool thereafter. The therapeutic dosage for Motofen should not exceed 8 tablets (8 milligrams of Difenoxin). There are currently no instructions indicating usage for irritable bowel syndrome (IBS) and Hyperhidrosis, although as stated above, it has been used successfully in treating symptoms of both disorders (which can accompany each other). There was a "Motofen half-strength" tablet, containing only 0.5 milligram of difenoxin, but it has since been discontinued. Only standard 1.0 milligram strength tablets are available by prescription.

== Availability, price, and supply ==
There is currently only one manufacturer of Motofen tablets: Valeant Pharmaceuticals. It acquired the drug from Amarin Pharmaceuticals in 2004. Valeant's tablets are pentagonal shaped, impressed with a "V" on one side, and vertically scored on the other side. In addition, the number "0500" is impressed bisecting the score line perpendicularly. The aforementioned bisection renders "05" and "00" on the left and right side of the score, respectively. Amarin's version were also pentagonal shaped, but impressed with an "A" on one side with "74" on the opposing.

Motofen is higher priced than both Imodium and Lomotil, does not have a generic equivalent, and is only available by prescription in the United States. Many United States insurance companies do not include Motofen as one of their formulary drugs, causing consumers to pay the highest copay, if it is covered by their health insurance at all. This is most likely due to the high cost of the medication itself, and the fact that similar lower-priced medicines can help ease symptoms of diarrhea. The United States is currently the only country where Motofen tablets are prescribed, approved by the government, and sold.

== Miscellaneous information ==
Strangely, Motofen is only included in the Physicians' Desk Reference (PDR) for the years 2005 and 2006 as a literal snippet entry. Nothing is said about the indications and usage, only the ingredients, current appearance (at the time of publishing), NDC#, and the quantities in which it is supplied. As of August 1, 2008, Motofen appears to have been discontinued by Valeant Pharmaceuticals. No reason has officially been released, and many severe irritable bowel syndrome (IBS) sufferers, for whom medications such as Imodium or Lomotil did not satisfactorily treat them, were left wondering why it was no longer available. The few pharmacists that were familiar with Motofen and their wholesalers were not given any notice either. In threads on medical sites, such as, WebMD, that had irritable bowel syndrome as the topic, those sufferers unable to find out any information on Motofen's status indicated that many pharmacists were unaware of the medication's existence or that it was even unavailable. Many Motofen users reported that they ended up contacting numerous pharmacies in their area to gather what remaining stocks of the little used niche drug. Some state that traveling distances of up to 200 miles, one way, to get the medication; almost exclusively found in smaller, more traditional pharmacies like The Medicine Shoppe or independent local ones, rather than major chains. It is because of the small numbers of those who cannot find relief from the above listed drugs that Motofen can run up to $200, out of pocket, for a monthly supply. As a result, there are virtually no health plans where Motofen is not an off-legend medication.

According to e-mails and calls to Valeant's customer service department, there was apparent issue with a manufacturer of one of the chemicals used in the making of difenoxin. This chemical's name, nor the manufacturer, would not be released to the public at-large. It was said that the manufacturer was not in the United States. Valeant did set up a list of those calling in about the medication to inform interested parties and it is assumed that this reaction by those who do need this medication is what prompted the return of Motofen despite the numerous instances of pushing back of the return date by Valeant.

Motofen is now back on the market as of June 2011 and available only by prescription in the United States.
