= Moguisteine =

Chemical compound

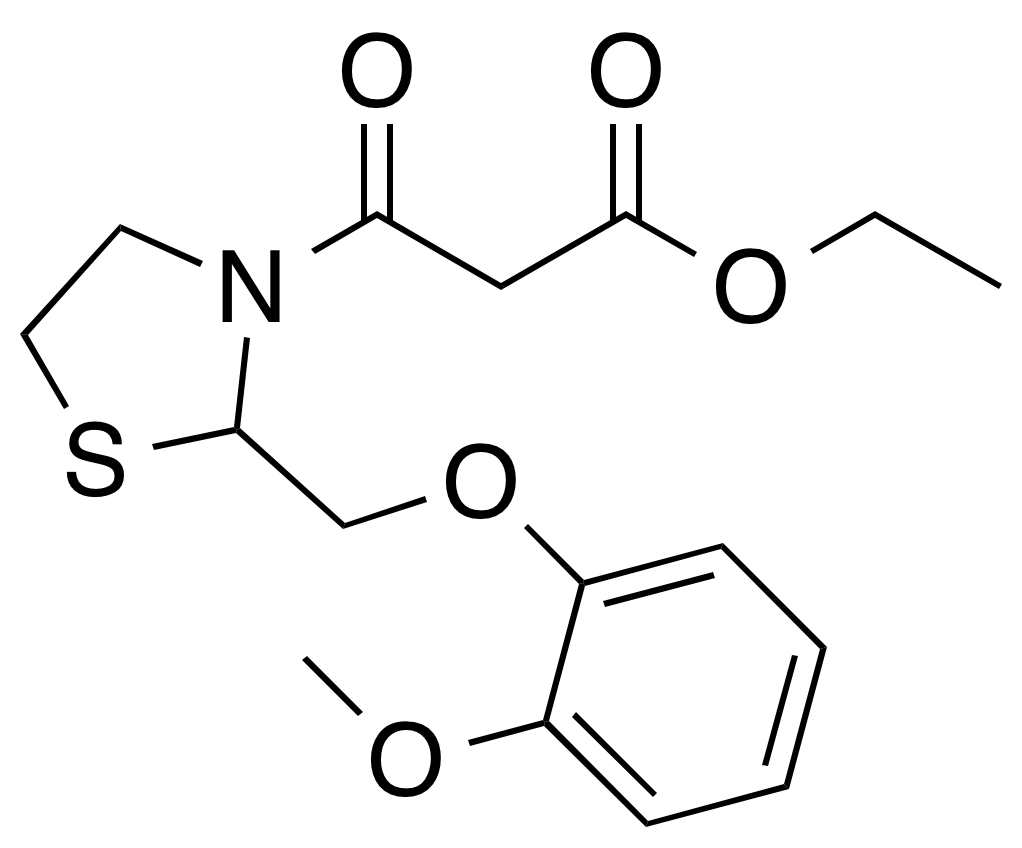

Identifiers
- IUPAC name: Ethyl 3-{2-[(2-methoxyphenoxy)methyl]-1,3-thiazolidin-3-yl}-3-oxopropanoate
- CAS Number: 119637-67-1
- PubChem CID: 65935
- ChemSpider: 59340
- UNII: 6Y556547YY
- ChEMBL: ChEMBL146980
- CompTox Dashboard (EPA): DTXSID00869634

Chemical and physical data
- Formula: C_{16}H_{21}NO_{5}S
- Molar mass: 339.41 g·mol^{−1}
- 3D model (JSmol): Interactive image
- SMILES: CCOC(=O)CC(=O)N1CCSC1COC2=CC=CC=C2OC
- InChI: InChI=1S/C16H21NO5S/c1-3-21-16(19)10-14(18)17-8-9-23-15(17)11-22-13-7-5-4-6-12(13)20-2/h4-7,15H,3,8-11H2,1-2H3; Key:WSYVIAQNTFPTBI-UHFFFAOYSA-N

Moguisteine is a non-narcotic, peripherally acting antitussive. In a small double-blind, randomized controlled trial, 200 mg of moguisteine suspension taken 3 times daily significantly reduced the frequency of coughing in patients with COPD, compared to placebo. It has also been studied in small trials in comparison to codeine and dextromethorphan, and has similar efficacy to both. It has not been approved for use in the United States.

It was discovered by searching for expectorants of the thiazolidine class, when compounds with a cough suppressant effect were accidentally found and moguisteine was selected as the most effective and safest representative of the class. Its mechanism of action may be the activation of ATP-sensitive potassium channels.
