= Dimetacrine =

Chemical compound

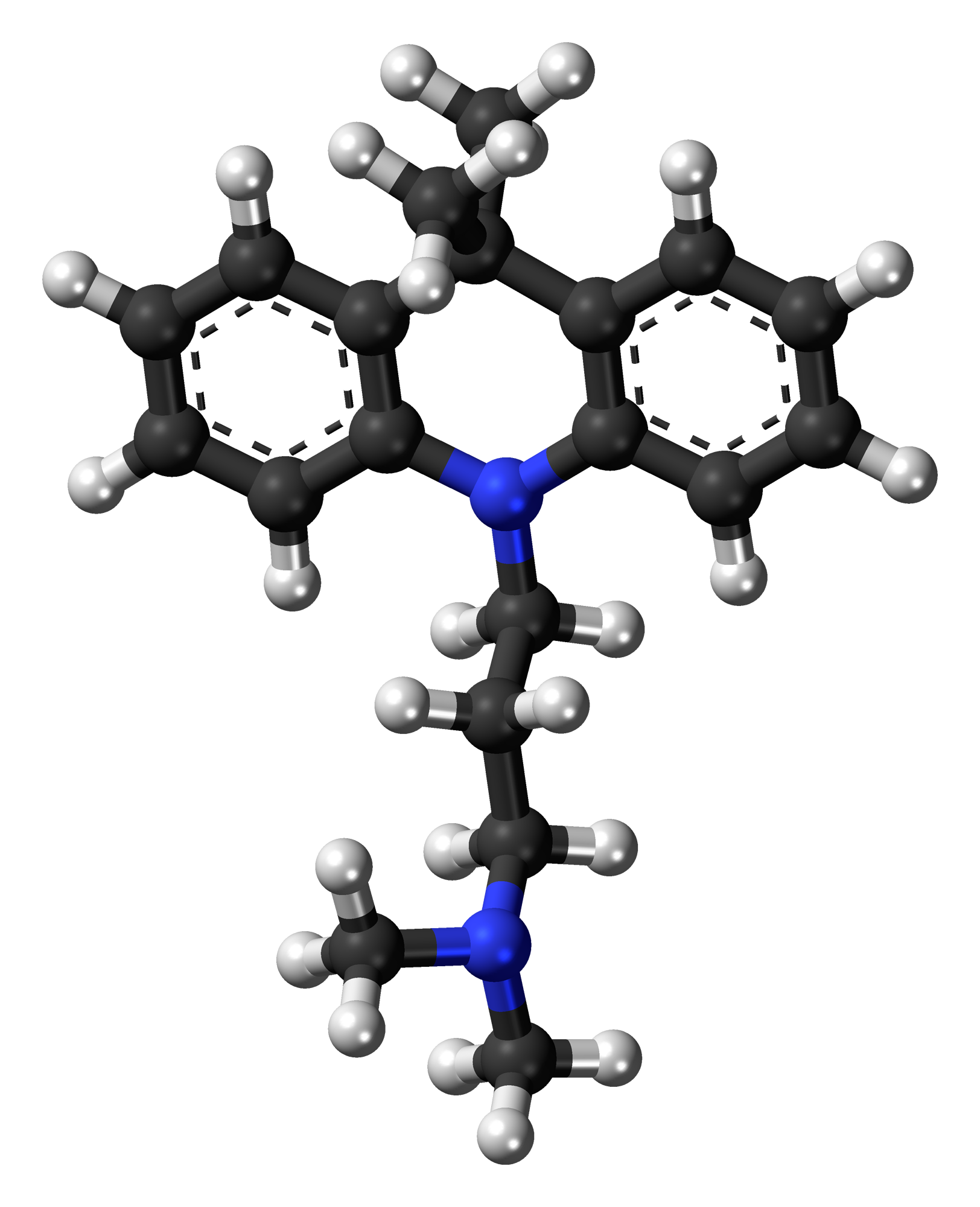

Clinical data
- Trade names: Istonil, Istonyl, Linostil, Miroistonil
- Other names: Dimethacrine, acripramine
- Routes of administration: Oral
- ATC code: N06AA18 (WHO)

Legal status
- Legal status: BR: Class C1 (Other controlled substances); In general: ℞ (Prescription only)

Identifiers
- IUPAC name: 3-(9,9-Dimethylacridin-10-yl)-N,N-dimethyl-propan-1-amine
- CAS Number: 4757-55-5
- PubChem CID: 94280
- DrugBank: DB08996
- ChemSpider: 85085
- UNII: O341NY501N
- KEGG: D02565
- CompTox Dashboard (EPA): DTXSID4022941

Chemical and physical data
- Formula: C_{20}H_{26}N_{2}
- Molar mass: 294.442 g·mol^{−1}
- 3D model (JSmol): Interactive image
- SMILES: CC1(C2=CC=CC=C2N(C3=CC=CC=C31)CCCN(C)C)C

Dimetacrine (also known as dimethacrine and acripramine; brand names Istonil, Istonyl, Linostil, and Miroistonil) is a tricyclic antidepressant (TCA) used in Europe and formerly in Japan for the treatment of depression. It has imipramine-like effects; though, in a double-blind clinical trial against imipramine, dimetacrine was found to have lower efficacy in comparison and produced more weight loss and abnormal liver tests.

Little is known about the pharmacology of dimetacrine, but it can be inferred that it acts in a similar manner to other TCAs. If this is indeed the case, dimetacrine may induce severe cardiac toxicity in overdose (a side effect unique to the tricyclic class of antidepressants).

== See also ==
- Monometacrine
- Botiacrine
- Melitracen
