= Nepidermin =

Chemical compound

Clinical data
- Trade names: Heberprot-P, Easyef, Genesoft, Kang He Su, Regen-D
- Other names: Recombinant human epidermal growth factor; rhEGF; DWP-401
- Routes of administration: intralesional injection; Topical

Identifiers
- IUPAC name: H-Asn-Ser-Asp-Ser-Glu-Cys-Pro-Leu-Ser-His-Asp-Gly-Tyr-Cys-Leu-His-Asp-Gly-Val-Cys-Met-Tyr-Ile-Glu-Ala-Leu-Asp-Lys-Tyr-Ala-Cys-Asn-Cys-Val-Val-Gly-Tyr-Ile-Gly-Glu-Arg-Cys-Gln-Tyr-Arg-Asp-Leu-Lys-Trp-Trp-Glu-Leu-Arg-OH
- CAS Number: 62253-63-8
- PubChem CID: 16143379
- ChemSpider: 17299876
- UNII: TZK30RF92W
- CompTox Dashboard (EPA): DTXSID80211314
- ECHA InfoCard: 100.241.060

Chemical and physical data
- Formula: C_{270}H_{401}N_{73}O_{83}S_{7}
- Molar mass: 6222.03 g·mol^{−1}
- 3D model (JSmol): Interactive image
- SMILES: CC[C@H](C)[C@@H](C(=O)NCC(=O)N[C@@H](CCC(=O)O)C(=O)N[C@@H](CCCNC(=N)N)C(=O)N[C@@H](CS)C(=O)N[C@@H](CCC(=O)N)C(=O)N[C@@H](CC1=CC=C(C=C1)O)C(=O)N[C@@H](CCCNC(=N)N)C(=O)N[C@@H](CC(=O)O)C(=O)N[C@@H](CC(C)C)C(=O)N[C@@H](CCCCN)C(=O)N[C@@H](CC2=CNC3=CC=CC=C32)C(=O)N[C@@H](CC4=CNC5=CC=CC=C54)C(=O)N[C@@H](CCC(=O)O)C(=O)N[C@@H](CC(C)C)C(=O)N[C@@H](CCCNC(=N)N)C(=O)O)NC(=O)[C@H](CC6=CC=C(C=C6)O)NC(=O)CNC(=O)[C@H](C(C)C)NC(=O)[C@H](C(C)C)NC(=O)[C@H](CS)NC(=O)[C@H](CC(=O)N)NC(=O)[C@H](CS)NC(=O)[C@H](C)NC(=O)[C@H](CC7=CC=C(C=C7)O)NC(=O)[C@H](CCCCN)NC(=O)[C@H](CC(=O)O)NC(=O)[C@H](CC(C)C)NC(=O)[C@H](C)NC(=O)[C@H](CCC(=O)O)NC(=O)[C@H]([C@@H](C)CC)NC(=O)[C@H](CC8=CC=C(C=C8)O)NC(=O)[C@H](CCSC)NC(=O)[C@H](CS)NC(=O)[C@H](C(C)C)NC(=O)CNC(=O)[C@H](CC(=O)O)NC(=O)[C@H](CC9=CN=CN9)NC(=O)[C@H](CC(C)C)NC(=O)[C@H](CS)NC(=O)[C@H](CC1=CC=C(C=C1)O)NC(=O)CNC(=O)[C@H](CC(=O)O)NC(=O)[C@H](CC1=CN=CN1)NC(=O)[C@H](CO)NC(=O)[C@H](CC(C)C)NC(=O)[C@@H]1CCCN1C(=O)[C@H](CS)NC(=O)[C@H](CCC(=O)O)NC(=O)[C@H](CO)NC(=O)[C@H](CC(=O)O)NC(=O)[C@H](CO)NC(=O)[C@H](CC(=O)N)N
- InChI: InChI=1S/C270H401N73O83S7/c1-24-134(19)217(262(420)293-112-201(355)298-161(69-74-205(359)360)229(387)301-160(45-35-82-286-269(279)280)228(386)333-192(119-428)255(413)307-162(68-73-198(274)352)230(388)316-176(94-141-54-64-150(350)65-55-141)241(399)304-159(44-34-81-285-268(277)278)227(385)325-186(105-212(373)374)248(406)313-169(87-127(5)6)235(393)302-158(43-31-33-80-272)226(384)318-179(97-144-108-289-156-41-29-27-39-153(144)156)243(401)319-178(96-143-107-288-155-40-28-26-38-152(143)155)242(400)305-164(71-76-207(363)364)231(389)312-170(88-128(7)8)236(394)310-167(267(425)426)46-36-83-287-270(281)282)341-250(408)174(92-139-50-60-148(348)61-51-139)300-203(357)113-292-261(419)214(131(13)14)340-264(422)216(133(17)18)339-259(417)195(122-431)335-246(404)182(101-200(276)354)322-257(415)191(118-427)332-220(378)137(22)297-234(392)175(93-140-52-62-149(349)63-53-140)315-225(383)157(42-30-32-79-271)303-247(405)185(104-211(371)372)326-237(395)168(86-126(3)4)311-219(377)136(21)296-224(382)163(70-75-206(361)362)309-265(423)218(135(20)25-2)342-251(409)177(95-142-56-66-151(351)67-57-142)317-233(391)166(78-85-433-23)308-256(414)194(121-430)336-263(421)215(132(15)16)338-204(358)114-291-223(381)184(103-210(369)370)323-244(402)180(98-145-109-283-124-294-145)320-238(396)171(89-129(9)10)314-258(416)193(120-429)334-240(398)173(91-138-48-58-147(347)59-49-138)299-202(356)111-290-222(380)183(102-209(367)368)324-245(403)181(99-146-110-284-125-295-146)321-254(412)190(117-346)330-239(397)172(90-130(11)12)328-260(418)197-47-37-84-343(197)266(424)196(123-432)337-232(390)165(72-77-208(365)366)306-252(410)189(116-345)331-249(407)187(106-213(375)376)327-253(411)188(115-344)329-221(379)154(273)100-199(275)353/h26-29,38-41,48-67,107-110,124-137,154,157-197,214-218,288-289,344-351,427-432H,24-25,30-37,42-47,68-106,111-123,271-273H2,1-23H3,(H2,274,352)(H2,275,353)(H2,276,354)(H,283,294)(H,284,295)(H,290,380)(H,291,381)(H,292,419)(H,293,420)(H,296,382)(H,297,392)(H,298,355)(H,299,356)(H,300,357)(H,301,387)(H,302,393)(H,303,405)(H,304,399)(H,305,400)(H,306,410)(H,307,413)(H,308,414)(H,309,423)(H,310,394)(H,311,377)(H,312,389)(H,313,406)(H,314,416)(H,315,383)(H,316,388)(H,317,391)(H,318,384)(H,319,401)(H,320,396)(H,321,412)(H,322,415)(H,323,402)(H,324,403)(H,325,385)(H,326,395)(H,327,411)(H,328,418)(H,329,379)(H,330,397)(H,331,407)(H,332,378)(H,333,386)(H,334,398)(H,335,404)(H,336,421)(H,337,390)(H,338,358)(H,339,417)(H,340,422)(H,341,408)(H,342,409)(H,359,360)(H,361,362)(H,363,364)(H,365,366)(H,367,368)(H,369,370)(H,371,372)(H,373,374)(H,375,376)(H,425,426)(H4,277,278,285)(H4,279,280,286)(H4,281,282,287)/t134-,135-,136-,137-,154-,157-,158-,159-,160-,161-,162-,163-,164-,165-,166-,167-,168-,169-,170-,171-,172-,173-,174-,175-,176-,177-,178-,179-,180-,181-,182-,183-,184-,185-,186-,187-,188-,189-,190-,191-,192-,193-,194-,195-,196-,197-,214-,215-,216-,217-,218-/m0/s1; Key:GVUGOAYIVIDWIO-UFWWTJHBSA-N

Nepidermin (INN proposed), also known as recombinant human epidermal growth factor (rhEGF), is a recombinant form of human epidermal growth factor (EGF) and a cicatrizant (a drug that promotes wound healing through formation of scar tissue). As a recombinant form of EGF, nepidermin is an agonist of the epidermal growth factor receptor (EGFR), and is the first EGFR agonist to be marketed. It was developed by Cuban Center for Genetic Engineering and Biotechnology (CIBG), and has been marketed by Heber Biotech as an intralesional injection for diabetic foot ulcer under the trade name Heberprot-P since 2006. As of 2016, Heberprot-P had been marketed in 23 countries, but remains unavailable in the United States. In 2015, preparations were made to conduct the Phase III trials required for FDA approval, however as of 2023 developments in U.S.-Cuba relations have stymied importation of the drug from Cuba.

Various forms of rhEGF are marketed for the treatment of diabetic foot ulcers, wounds, and alopecia (hair loss) in Vietnam, the Philippines, Thailand, and China.

== Production ==
According to Heber Biotech, nepidermin is made by insering the 53-amino acid human EGF sequence into yeast. A 1991 paper from Cuba seems to describe its production in more detail. An improved process was described in 2009.

== Other rhEGFs ==
Several other products containing recombinant human EGF have been marketed. The potencies of these products can differ by the expression system used, despite all intending to match the structure of human EGF.

Instead of measuring by mass, the international unit system from the World Health Organization provides a way to describe the potency-adjusted amount of rhEGF. However, the WHO does not prescribe a specific way of measuring the potency. rhEGF bioassay remains a field in active development.

=== Other preparations ===
List of rhEGF preparations
Brand name	Manufacturer	Form	Indication	Description
Heberprot-P	Heber (Cuba)	Lyophilized powder	Ulcer	See above. Drugs.com reports marketing in Vietnam and Georgia.
Easyef	Daewoong (Korea)	Spray	Ulcer, wounds	See above. Drugs.com reports marketing in Thailand and Vietnam.
Genesoft (金因舒)	Uni-Bio (Hong Kong); Licensed to GeneTech (China)	Eye drop	Corneal damage (?)	Approved in China (Rx, 国药准字 S20040006). Yeast expression system.
GeneTime (金因肽)	Uni-Bio (Hong Kong); Licensed to GeneTech (China)	Spray		Approved in China (Rx, 国药准字 S20010037–8). E. coli expression system.
Kang He Su (康合素)	Haohai (China)	Lyophilized powder	second-degree burns, wounds, ulcers	Approved in China (Rx, 国药准字 S20010094–6, S20010099). To be used as a part of wound dressing, soaked in gauze. E. coli expression system.
Yi Fu (易孚)		Gel	second-degree burns, wounds, ulcers	Approved in China (Rx). Yeast expression system.
Regen-D	Bharat Biotech (India)	Gel	Diabetic foot ulcer	Approved in India and Thailand. E. coli expression system. Bharat also markets a gel with silver sulfadiazine and chlorhexidine for burns.

== See also ==
- Becaplermin
- Murodermin
