= Mucoprotein =

Glycoproteins composed primarily of mucopolysaccharides

A mucoprotein is a glycoprotein composed primarily of mucopolysaccharides. Mucoproteins can be found throughout the body, including the gastrointestinal tract, reproductive organs, airways, and the synovial fluid of the knees. They are called mucoproteins because the carbohydrate quantity is more than 4% unlike glycoproteins where the carbohydrate quantity is less than 4%. Mucoprotein is produced in the cecum of the gastrointestinal tract. During gallbladder cancer, mucoprotein is over expressed. Sustaining a brain injury will lead to decreased mucoprotein production. The result is an alteration of gut microbiota as seen in mice.

== Function ==
Mucoproteins are the proteins that are the building blocks of mucus, which is a protective barrier to the epithelia of cells. It is semipermeable, so it acts as a barrier to most bacteria and pathogens, while allowing for the uptake of nutrients, water, and hormones.

== Protein Structure ==
Mucoproteins are composed of o-linked carbohydrates as well as highly glycosylated proteins, which are held together by disulfide bonds. The viscosity of the mucus depends on the strength of the disulfide bonds. When these disulfide bonds are broken, the viscosity of the mucus secretions is reduced.

== Clinical Significance ==
Mucolytic medications will break through the disulfide bonds and lower the viscosity of the mucus, thus allowing the hypersecreted mucus to be more manageable. A hypersectretion of mucus is often a symptom of pulmonary diseases or respiratory infections.

There are two subgroups in mycolytic medications and each one works differently to control the hypersecreted mucus.

- Classic mucolytic medications: these medications change the disulfide bond by reducing it to a thiol bond, thus thoroughly breaking down the mucoproteins and making the mucus more manageable.
- Peptide mucolytic medications: these medications depolymerize DNA polymer and F-actin links that are present when the mucus hypersecretes. This preserves the mucins that are helpful to the epithelial tissue of the lungs.

== Bibliography ==
- Houlden, A.; Goldrick, M.; Brough, D.; Vizi, E.S.; Lénárt, N.; Martinecz, B.; Roberts, I.S.; Denes, A. (October 2016). "Brain injury induces specific changes in the caecal microbiota of mice via altered autonomic activity and mucoprotein production". Brain, Behavior, and Immunity. 57: 10–20. doi:10.1016/j.bbi.2016.04.003. PMC 5021180. PMID 27060191.
- Aksoy, Murat; Guven, Suleyman; Tosun, Ilknur; Aydın, Faruk; Kart, Cavit (September 2012). "The effect of ethinyl estradiol and drospirenone-containing oral contraceptives upon mucoprotein content of cervical mucus". European Journal of Obstetrics & Gynecology and Reproductive Biology. 164 (1): 40–43. doi:10.1016/j.ejogrb.2012.05.002. PMID 22633169.
- Aronson, Jeffrey K., ed. (2016). "Acetylcysteine". Meyler's Side Effects of Drugs. pp. 23–25. doi:10.1016/b978-0-444-53717-1.00217-1. ISBN 978-0-444-53716-4.
- Gupta, Rishab; Wadhwa, Roopma (2024). "Mucolytic Medications". StatPearls. StatPearls Publishing. PMID 32644589.
- Cone, Richard A. (February 2009). "Barrier properties of mucus". Advanced Drug Delivery Reviews. 61 (2): 75–85. doi:10.1016/j.addr.2008.09.008. PMID 19135107.
- Kumar, Puneet; Shukla, Priyesh; Kumari, Soni; Dixit, Ruhi; Narayan, Gopeshwar; Dixit, V. K.; Khanna, A. K. (June 2022). "Expression of Mucoproteins in Gallbladder Cancer". Indian Journal of Surgery. 84 (3): 456–462. doi:10.1007/s12262-021-02989-7.
