= Fexlamose =

Investigational drug

Clinical data
- Other names: AER-01; MUC-031

Identifiers
- IUPAC name: (2S,3S,4S,5R,6R)-2-(sulfanylmethyl)-6-[(2R,3R,4S,5S,6S)-3,4,5-trihydroxy-6-(sulfanylmethyl)oxan-2-yl]oxyoxane-3,4,5-triol
- CAS Number: 1285607-08-0
- PubChem CID: 172866809
- ChemSpider: 129998742
- UNII: VY9GAK6EVR

Chemical and physical data
- Formula: C_{12}H_{22}O_{9}S_{2}
- Molar mass: 374.42 g·mol^{−1}
- 3D model (JSmol): Interactive image
- SMILES: C([C@@H]1[C@H]([C@@H]([C@H]([C@H](O1)O[C@@H]2[C@@H]([C@H]([C@@H]([C@H](O2)CS)O)O)O)O)O)O)S
- InChI: InChI=InChI=1S/C12H22O9S2/c13-5-3(1-22)19-11(9(17)7(5)15)21-12-10(18)8(16)6(14)4(2-23)20-12/h3-18,22-23H,1-2H2/t3-,4-,5-,6-,7+,8+,9-,10-,11-,12-/m1/s1; Key:LVLYFBOCRJBHIZ-LIZSDCNHSA-N

Fexlamose is an investigational new drug that is being developed by Aer Therapeutics for the treatment of chronic obstructive pulmonary disease. It is mucolytic agent that contains a thiol linked to a saccharide that undergoes thiol–disulfide exchange with mucin disulfide bridges thereby breaking those bonds between mucin subunits and reducing the viscosity of mucin.
