= Co-tenidone =

Combination medication

Combination of
- Atenolol: Beta blocker
- Chlortalidone: Thiazide diuretic

Clinical data
- Routes of administration: Oral

Legal status
- Legal status: UK: POM (Prescription only)

Identifiers
- ChemSpider: 151231

Co-tenidone (BAN) is a non-proprietary name used to denote a combination of atenolol and chlortalidone. Co-tenidone is used in the treatment of hypertension. The use of β-blockers in hypertension was downgraded in June 2006 in the United Kingdom to fourth-line because they perform less well than other drugs, and because atenolol, the most frequently used β-blocker, carries an unacceptable risk of provoking type 2 diabetes at usual doses.

== Formulation ==
Two strengths of co-tenidone are currently available in the UK:

- 50 mg atenolol and 12.5 mg chlortalidone, BAN of Co-tenidone 50/12.5
- 100 mg atenolol and 25 mg chlortalidone, BAN of Co-tenidone 100/25
