= Botiacrine =

Abandoned antiparkinsonian agent

Clinical data
- Other names: Mo 876; DMA

Identifiers
- IUPAC name: S-[2-(dimethylamino)ethyl] 9,9-dimethylacridine-10-carbothioate
- CAS Number: 4774-53-2
- PubChem CID: 71202
- ChemSpider: 64338
- UNII: 032WJR708Q
- ChEMBL: ChEMBL2106109
- CompTox Dashboard (EPA): DTXSID60963925

Chemical and physical data
- Formula: C_{20}H_{24}N_{2}OS
- Molar mass: 340.49 g·mol^{−1}
- 3D model (JSmol): Interactive image
- SMILES: CC1(C2=CC=CC=C2N(C3=CC=CC=C31)C(=O)SCCN(C)C)C
- InChI: InChI=1S/C20H24N2OS/c1-20(2)15-9-5-7-11-17(15)22(18-12-8-6-10-16(18)20)19(23)24-14-13-21(3)4/h5-12H,13-14H2,1-4H3; Key:QXRUCDDVUMKOPI-UHFFFAOYSA-N

Botiacrine (INN; developmental code name Mo 876) is a drug of the tricyclic family described as an antiparkinsonian agent which was either never marketed or was possibly marketed outside of the United States. It was first described in the literature by 1965. The drug is an acridine derivative and is structurally related to the tricyclic antidepressant dimetacrine.
