= 1DD-LSD =

Chemical compound

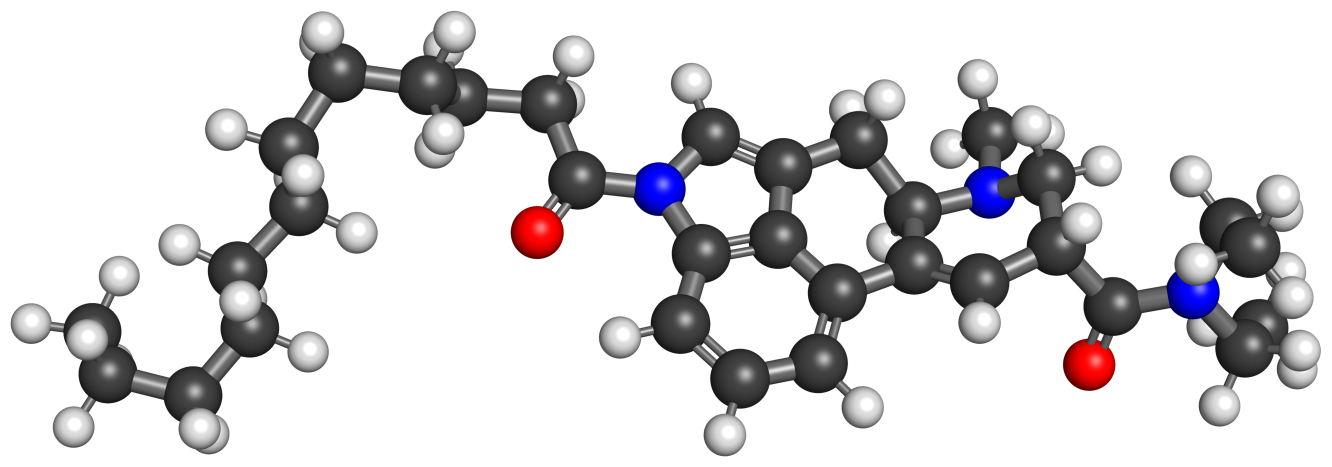

Clinical data
- Other names: 1-Dodecanoyl-LSD; SYN-L-004
- Routes of administration: Oral
- Drug class: Serotonergic psychedelic; Hallucinogen

Identifiers
- IUPAC name: (6aR,9R)-N,N-diethyl-6-methyl-4-dodecanoyl-4,6,6a,7,8,9-hexahydroindolo[4,3-fg]quinoline-9-carboxamide
- CAS Number: 3028949-80-3
- PubChem CID: 170763787

Chemical and physical data
- Formula: C_{32}H_{47}N_{3}O_{2}
- Molar mass: 505.747 g·mol^{−1}
- 3D model (JSmol): Interactive image
- SMILES: CCCCCCCCCCCC(=O)N1C=C2C[C@@H]3C(=C[C@H](CN3C)C(=O)N(CC)CC)C4=C2C1=CC=C4
- InChI: InChI=1S/C32H47N3O2/c1-5-8-9-10-11-12-13-14-15-19-30(36)35-23-24-21-29-27(26-17-16-18-28(35)31(24)26)20-25(22-33(29)4)32(37)34(6-2)7-3/h16-18,20,23,25,29H,5-15,19,21-22H2,1-4H3/t25-,29-/m1/s1; Key:CEPIQEJKLWHRTL-VAVYLYDRSA-N

1DD-LSD, also known as 1-dodecanoyl-LSD or as SYN-L-004, is an acylated derivative of lysergic acid diethylamide (LSD). In animal studies, it produces a weak head-twitch response but with 27x lower potency than LSD itself. It is being researched as a potential slow-onset, long lasting prodrug for LSD which is expected to have reduced psychoactive effects.

== Chemistry ==
=== Analogues ===
Analogues of 1DD-LSD include ALD-52 (1A-LSD), 1P-LSD, 1B-LSD, 1H-LSD, and 1V-LSD, among others.

== Society and culture ==
=== Legal status ===
==== Canada ====
1DD-LSD is not a controlled substance in Canada as of 2025.

==== United States ====
1DD-LSD is not an explicitly controlled substance in the United States. However, it could be considered a controlled substance under the Federal Analogue Act if intended for human consumption.

== See also ==
- Substituted lysergamide
- Lizard Labs
