= Merimepodib =

Chemical compound

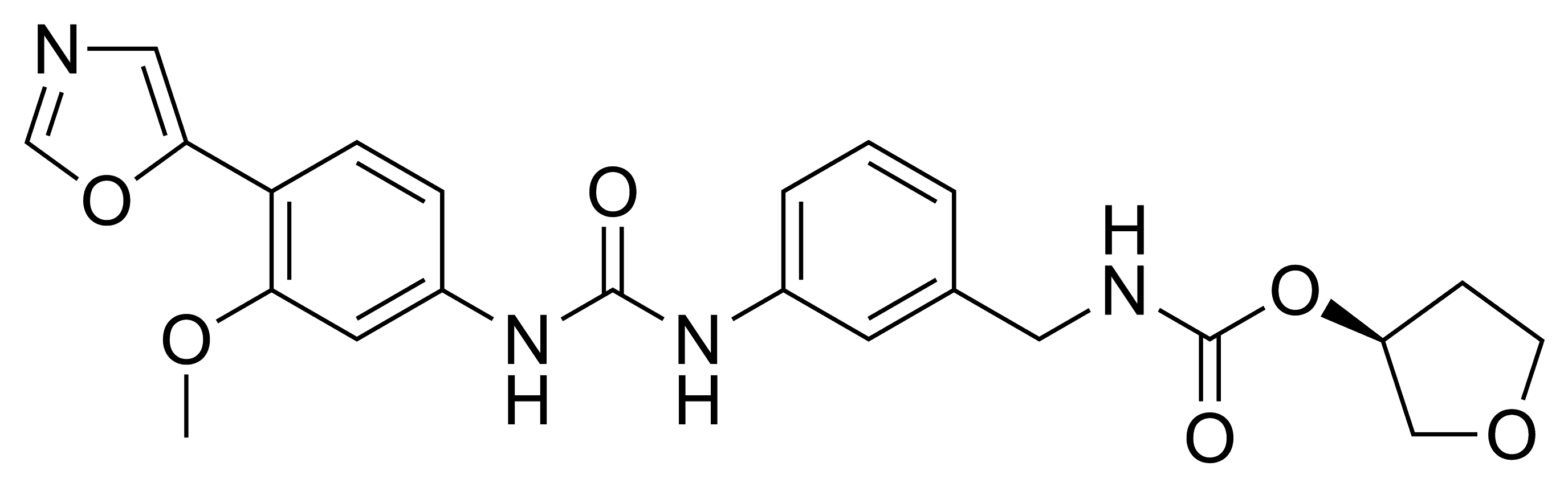

Legal status
- Legal status: US: Investigational drug

Identifiers
- IUPAC name: [(3S)-oxolan-3-yl] N-[(3-{[3-methoxy-4-(1,3-oxazol-5-yl)phenyl]carbamoylamino}phenyl)methyl]carbamate
- CAS Number: 198821-22-6
- PubChem CID: 153241
- DrugBank: DB04862
- ChemSpider: 135060
- UNII: 2ZL2BA06FU
- KEGG: D04936
- ChEMBL: ChEMBL304087
- CompTox Dashboard (EPA): DTXSID70173639

Chemical and physical data
- Formula: C_{23}H_{24}N_{4}O_{6}
- Molar mass: 452.467 g·mol^{−1}
- 3D model (JSmol): Interactive image
- SMILES: COC1=C(C=CC(=C1)NC(=O)NC2=CC=CC(=C2)CNC(=O)O[C@H]3CCOC3)C4=CN=CO4
- InChI: InChI=1S/C23H24N4O6/c1-30-20-10-17(5-6-19(20)21-12-24-14-32-21)27-22(28)26-16-4-2-3-15(9-16)11-25-23(29)33-18-7-8-31-13-18/h2-6,9-10,12,14,18H,7-8,11,13H2,1H3,(H,25,29)(H2,26,27,28)/t18-/m0/s1; Key:JBPUGFODGPKTDW-SFHVURJKSA-N

Merimepodib (VX-497) is a drug which acts as an inhibitor of the enzyme inosine monophosphate dehydrogenase, which is required for the synthesis of nucleotide bases containing guanine. This consequently inhibits synthesis of DNA and RNA, and results in antiviral and immunosuppressive effects. It progressed as far as Phase 2b human clinical trials against hepatitis C, but showed only modest benefits in comparison to existing treatments; however, it continued to be studied, and also shows activity against other viral diseases such as Zika virus and foot and mouth disease virus.

Merimepodib was investigated in combination with remdesivir in a phase 2 clinical trial in the U.S. as a potential treatment of COVID-19 by ViralClear Pharmaceuticals. The trial stopped in October 2020, and the company announced in a news release that it was "unlikely that the trial would meet its primary safety endpoints", and that it "does not intend to further develop merimepodib".
