= Co-amilozide =

Combination medication

Combination of
- Amiloride: Potassium-sparing diuretic
- Hydrochlorothiazide: Thiazide diuretic

Clinical data
- AHFS/Drugs.com: International Drug Names
- Routes of administration: Oral
- ATC code: C03EA01 (WHO)

Legal status
- Legal status: UK: POM (Prescription only)

Identifiers
- CAS Number: 57017-78-4
- PubChem CID: 107748
- ChemSpider: 96911
- CompTox Dashboard (EPA): DTXSID90218652

Co-amilozide (BAN) is a non-proprietary combination of amiloride and hydrochlorothiazide. Co-amilozide is used in the treatment of hypertension and congestive heart failure with the tendency of the thiazide to cause low potassium levels (hypokalaemia) offset by the potassium-sparing effects of amiloride.

== Formulation ==
Two strengths of co-amilozide are currently available in the UK:

- 2.5 mg amiloride and 25 mg hydrochlorothiazide, BAN of Co-amilozide 2.5/25 (brand name Moduret 25)
- 5 mg amiloride and 50 mg hydrochlorothiazide, BAN of Co-amilozide 5/50 (brand name Moduretic)

In North America:

- Moduretic (U.S., Canada)
  - Moduretic 5-50 (U.S., Canada)
- Novamilor (Canada)

== Side effects ==
The most common side effect is headache (about 8% of people taking it) and nausea, loss of appetite, weakness, rash and dizziness (each about 3%).

Common side effects (1/10 - 1/100) include:

- General: weakness, fatigue, loss of appetite, headache, dizziness.
- Circulatory system: arrhythmia.
- Gastrointestinal: nausea, diarrhea, abdominal pain.
- Skin: exanthema, itching.
- Respiratory system: shortness of breath, cough.
- Metabolic: elevated blood sugar in diabetic patients, elevated uric acid levels in the blood.
- Musculoskeletal: pain in the limbs.
