= International English food terms =

The following list of international English food terms points out differences in food terminology between some different dialects of English.

== List ==
United States	Canada	UK	Australia
Dairy, eggs & meat
whole milk	homogenized or 3% milk	full fat or whole milk	full-cream milk
skim, fat free, or nonfat milk	skimmed milk, skim milk	skimmed milk	skim milk
2% milk	2% milk	semi-skimmed milk	"hilo"
large egg	large egg	medium egg	large egg
ground meat or chopped (usually beef)	ground or minced meat	mince or minced meat	mince
Produce/vegetables
green onion or scallion	green onion	spring onion (scallion in some areas)	spring onion
cilantro	cilantro or coriander (or cilantro may refer to the leafy herb, and coriander to the dried spice of the seed)	coriander	coriander
cantaloupe	cantaloupe	cantaloupe	or rockmelon
zucchini	zucchini	courgette	zucchini
squash	squash	marrow or squash — marrow specifically refers to a large, green elongated squash with white flesh	pumpkin or squash
eggplant	eggplant	aubergine	eggplant
garbanzo or chickpea	chickpea	chickpea	chickpea
navy beans	haricots	haricot beans	haricot beans
chard	chard	silverbeet or chard	silverbeet
bell peppers or green/red/yellow peppers	green peppers or bell peppers	peppers, or green peppers (or red/yellow/orange peppers)	capsicum — bell peppers sometimes describe a much smaller, sweeter pepper
chili peppers, hot peppers, chiles or by individual name (jalapeño, e.g.)		chillis	chillies, or by individual name (jalapeño, e.g.)
Prepared foods
pickle	pickle (gherkin refers specifically to a "dwarf" pickle)	gherkin	gherkin
bouillon or stock cube	stock cube	stock cube	stock cube
French fries or fries, or steak fries (for thicker versions), also "fish and chips"	French fries, fries, or chips, depending on region, also "fish and chips"	chips	chips
chips or potato chips	chips or potato chips	crisps	chips or potato chips
apple crisp or apple crumble	apple crisp or apple crumble	apple crumble	apple crumble
ketchup or catsup	ketchup	tomato ketchup or tomato sauce or red sauce	tomato sauce
Baking and baked goods
bread flour	bread flour	strong flour	bread flour
all-purpose flour	all-purpose flour	plain flour	plain flour
self-rising flour	self-rising flour	self-raising flour	self-raising flour
cornstarch or corn starch	cornstarch	corn flour	cornflour
golden raisins	sultana raisins	sultanas	sultanas
corn syrup or Karo^{R} syrup	corn syrup	corn syrup	corn syrup
molasses	molasses	molasses – treacle describes a lighter molasses	molasses – treacle describes a lighter molasses
powdered sugar or confectioner's sugar	icing sugar or confectionery sugar	icing sugar	icing sugar
superfine sugar		caster sugar	caster sugar
bread pudding		Bread and butter pudding	Bread and butter pudding
Steamed sponge pudding		Sponge pudding (when made with currants, raisins or sultanas it is called Spotted dick)	no equivalent
Drinks
lemonade	lemonade	traditional, cloudy or still lemonade (NB traditional/cloudy lemonade can also be fizzy); lemon squash	lemon squash
soda, pop, soda pop, cola, coke, or soft drink	pop	soft drink (although this refers to any non-alcoholic drink or fruit juice), fizzy drink, fizzy pop, pop or juice (Scotland)	soft drink
lemon-lime soda/pop, or a brand name (e.g. Sprite)	lemon or lemon-lime drink	lemonade	lemonade
fruit drink concentrate	fruit concentrate	squash or cordial	cordial
apple juice or cider	apple juice	apple juice	sparkling apple juice
hard cider	cider or hard cider	cider	cider
vermouth	Vermouth	vermouth	vermouth
Sweets
dessert	dessert	dessert or pudding (in addition to the use describing pudding)	dessert
Jell-o, Jello, jello or gelatin	Jell-o, Jello, jello or gelatin	jelly	jelly
cookie	cookie (unless referring to tea biscuits, for example)	biscuit; also cookie, which refers to large soft "American-style" biscuits	biscuit; also cookie, same definition as UK
biscuit	biscuit, scone	scone	scone
digestive cookie	digestive cookie	digestive or digestive biscuit	digestive biscuit

== Digestive biscuits and Graham crackers ==
These two items are fairly different, but are used similarly (e.g. to make crumb crusts for a cheesecake). Graham crackers are sweeter, and are available in different flavors (e.g. cinnamon, chocolate). Digestive biscuits are richer, and while slightly sweet, are used with cheese by a small minority. They are also available coated on one side with milk chocolate or dark chocolate. Digestive biscuits are common in the Northeast United States, served with tea. Peek Frean is a common brand in the United States, however the original producer McVities still produces the biscuit in the UK.

== Chips and French fries ==
In Ireland and the UK, deep fried potato sticks or "french fries" are called "skinny chips/fries", while "chips" are thicker potato sticks which can be deep fried or oven baked.

== Apple juice, cider and hard cider ==
In America, fermented apple juice is called "hard cider". "Apple cider" refers to unfiltered (un-fermented) apple juice, typically pasteurized to make it shelf-stable. In New England and parts of Canada, "fresh cider" or sweet cider refers to fresh pressed apple juice; this is unlike any commercial product, and can be found at farm stands and orchards.

American cider (both fresh and hard) is sometimes also made from pears. This is referred to as "pear cider," and is equivalent to perry.

== See also ==
- American and British English differences
- British Approved Name
