= Meseclazone =

Chemical compound

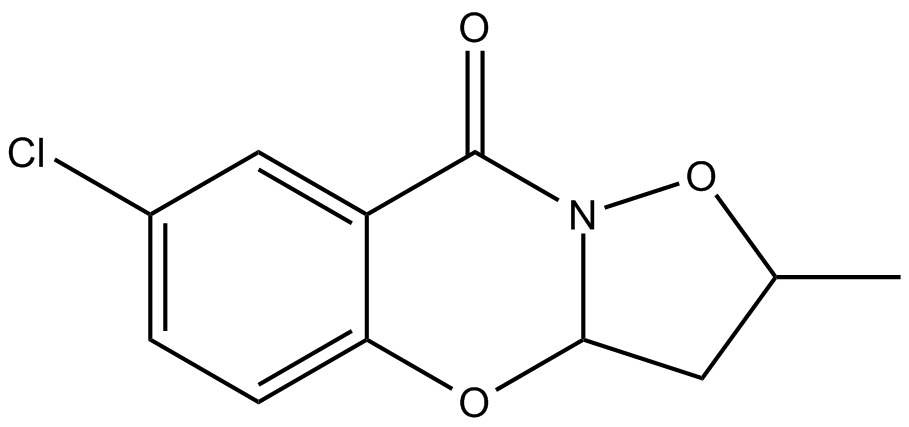

Clinical data
- Routes of administration: Oral
- ATC code: none

Legal status
- Legal status: In general: uncontrolled

Identifiers
- IUPAC name: 7-chloro-2-methyl-3,3a-dihydro-2H,9H-[1,2]oxazolo[3,2-b][1,3]benzoxazin-9-one
- CAS Number: 29053-27-8
- PubChem CID: 34445
- ChemSpider: 31698
- UNII: 51KFT71THG
- KEGG: D04941
- ChEMBL: ChEMBL2104738
- CompTox Dashboard (EPA): DTXSID70865466

Chemical and physical data
- Formula: C_{11}H_{10}ClNO_{3}
- Molar mass: 239.66 g·mol^{−1}
- 3D model (JSmol): Interactive image
- SMILES: Clc2cc1C(=O)N3OC(CC3Oc1cc2)C

Meseclazone (W-2395), also known as 2-methylseclazone, is a nonsteroidal anti-inflammatory drug (NSAID) developed in the 1970s. It functions as a prodrug to the 5-chloro derivative of salicyclic acid. It was never marketed on account of toxicity issues, namely pertaining to the liver.

== See also ==
- Salicyclic acid
