= Murodermin =

Chemical compound

Clinical data
- Other names: Recombinant murine epidermal growth factor; rmEGF

Identifiers
- IUPAC name: H-Asn-Ser-Tyr-Pro-Gly-Cys(1)-Pro-Ser-Ser-Tyr-Asp-Gly-Tyr-Cys(2)-Leu-Asn-Gly-Gly-Val-Cys(1)-Met-His-Ile-Glu-Ser-Leu-Asp-Ser-Tyr-Thr-Cys(2)-Asn-Cys(3)-Val-Ile-Gly-Tyr-Ser-Gly-Asp-Arg-Cys(3)-Gln-Thr-Arg-Asp-Leu-Arg-Trp-Trp-Glu-Leu-Arg-OH
- CAS Number: 54017-73-1
- PubChem CID: 16129699
- ChemSpider: 17286501
- UNII: 7B6TM0214A
- CompTox Dashboard (EPA): DTXSID40202364

Chemical and physical data
- Formula: C_{257}H_{375}N_{73}O_{83}S_{7}
- Molar mass: 6039.68 g·mol^{−1}
- 3D model (JSmol): Interactive image
- SMILES: CC[C@H](C)[C@H]1C(=O)N[C@H](C(=O)N[C@H](C(=O)N[C@H](C(=O)N[C@H](C(=O)N[C@H](C(=O)N[C@H](C(=O)N[C@H](C(=O)N[C@@H](CSSC[C@H]2C(=O)N[C@H](C(=O)N[C@H](C(=O)NCC(=O)NCC(=O)N[C@H](C(=O)N[C@@H](CSSC[C@@H](C(=O)N3CCC[C@H]3C(=O)N[C@H](C(=O)N[C@H](C(=O)N[C@H](C(=O)N[C@H](C(=O)NCC(=O)N[C@H](C(=O)N2)CC4=CC=C(C=C4)O)CC(=O)O)CC5=CC=C(C=C5)O)CO)CO)NC(=O)CNC(=O)[C@@H]6CCCN6C(=O)[C@H](CC7=CC=C(C=C7)O)NC(=O)[C@H](CO)NC(=O)[C@H](CC(=O)N)N)C(=O)N[C@H](C(=O)N[C@H](C(=O)N1)CC8=CN=CN8)CCSC)C(C)C)CC(=O)N)CC(C)C)C(=O)N[C@@H](CC(=O)N)C(=O)N[C@H]9CSSC[C@H](NC(=O)[C@@H](NC(=O)[C@@H](NC(=O)CNC(=O)[C@@H](NC(=O)[C@@H](NC(=O)CNC(=O)[C@@H](NC(=O)[C@@H](NC9=O)C(C)C)[C@@H](C)CC)CC1=CC=C(C=C1)O)CO)CC(=O)O)CCCNC(=N)N)C(=O)N[C@@H](CCC(=O)N)C(=O)N[C@@H]([C@@H](C)O)C(=O)N[C@@H](CCCNC(=N)N)C(=O)N[C@@H](CC(=O)O)C(=O)N[C@@H](CC(C)C)C(=O)N[C@@H](CCCNC(=N)N)C(=O)N[C@@H](CC1=CNC2=CC=CC=C21)C(=O)N[C@@H](CC1=CNC2=CC=CC=C21)C(=O)N[C@@H](CCC(=O)O)C(=O)N[C@@H](CC(C)C)C(=O)N[C@@H](CCCNC(=N)N)C(=O)O)[C@@H](C)O)CC1=CC=C(C=C1)O)CO)CC(=O)O)CC(C)C)CO)CCC(=O)O
- InChI: InChI=1S/C257H375N73O83S7/c1-20-123(15)203-245(404)283-103-192(351)285-157(80-127-42-52-135(339)53-43-127)222(381)313-171(104-331)210(369)281-101-191(350)287-167(92-198(360)361)228(387)290-146(37-27-70-273-255(265)266)213(372)318-177(238(397)292-148(62-65-185(259)344)217(376)327-205(125(17)337)249(408)294-147(38-28-71-274-256(267)268)212(371)309-168(93-199(362)363)229(388)298-153(76-117(3)4)218(377)289-145(36-26-69-272-254(263)264)211(370)303-162(86-133-96-277-144-35-25-23-33-141(133)144)226(385)304-161(85-132-95-276-143-34-24-22-32-140(132)143)225(384)291-149(63-66-195(354)355)214(373)297-154(77-118(5)6)219(378)296-152(253(412)413)39-29-72-275-257(269)270)110-415-418-114-181(242(401)324-202(122(13)14)247(406)326-203)320-227(386)165(90-188(262)347)307-241(400)180-113-417-416-111-178-240(399)300-156(79-120(9)10)220(379)306-164(89-187(261)346)208(367)279-98-189(348)278-99-194(353)323-201(121(11)12)246(405)321-179(239(398)293-151(68-75-414-19)216(375)305-163(87-134-97-271-116-284-134)232(391)325-204(124(16)21-2)248(407)295-150(64-67-196(356)357)215(374)314-173(106-333)233(392)299-155(78-119(7)8)221(380)310-169(94-200(364)365)230(389)315-174(107-334)234(393)302-160(83-130-48-58-138(342)59-49-130)231(390)328-206(126(18)338)250(409)322-180)112-419-420-115-182(288-193(352)102-282-243(402)183-40-30-73-329(183)251(410)170(84-131-50-60-139(343)61-51-131)311-236(395)172(105-332)312-207(366)142(258)88-186(260)345)252(411)330-74-31-41-184(330)244(403)317-176(109-336)237(396)316-175(108-335)235(394)301-159(82-129-46-56-137(341)57-47-129)224(383)308-166(91-197(358)359)209(368)280-100-190(349)286-158(223(382)319-178)81-128-44-54-136(340)55-45-128/h22-25,32-35,42-61,95-97,116-126,142,145-184,201-206,276-277,331-343H,20-21,26-31,36-41,62-94,98-115,258H2,1-19H3,(H2,259,344)(H2,260,345)(H2,261,346)(H2,262,347)(H,271,284)(H,278,348)(H,279,367)(H,280,368)(H,281,369)(H,282,402)(H,283,404)(H,285,351)(H,286,349)(H,287,350)(H,288,352)(H,289,377)(H,290,387)(H,291,384)(H,292,397)(H,293,398)(H,294,408)(H,295,407)(H,296,378)(H,297,373)(H,298,388)(H,299,392)(H,300,399)(H,301,394)(H,302,393)(H,303,370)(H,304,385)(H,305,375)(H,306,379)(H,307,400)(H,308,383)(H,309,371)(H,310,380)(H,311,395)(H,312,366)(H,313,381)(H,314,374)(H,315,389)(H,316,396)(H,317,403)(H,318,372)(H,319,382)(H,320,386)(H,321,405)(H,322,409)(H,323,353)(H,324,401)(H,325,391)(H,326,406)(H,327,376)(H,328,390)(H,354,355)(H,356,357)(H,358,359)(H,360,361)(H,362,363)(H,364,365)(H,412,413)(H4,263,264,272)(H4,265,266,273)(H4,267,268,274)(H4,269,270,275)/t123-,124-,125+,126+,142-,145-,146-,147-,148-,149-,150-,151-,152-,153-,154-,155-,156-,157-,158-,159-,160-,161-,162-,163-,164-,165-,166-,167-,168-,169-,170-,171-,172-,173-,174-,175-,176-,177-,178-,179-,180-,181-,182-,183-,184-,201-,202-,203-,204-,205-,206-/m0/s1; Key:WLGOTMXHWBRTJA-GACYYNSASA-N

Murodermin (INN), also known as recombinant murine epidermal growth factor (rmEGF), is a recombinant form of mouse epidermal growth factor (EGF) and an EGF receptor agonist which was never marketed.

== See also ==
- Nepidermin
