= Monometacrine =

Abandoned antidepressant

Clinical data
- Other names: Desmethyldimetacrine; Nordimetacrine; N-Desmethyldimetacrine; SD-735; NSC-100296

Identifiers
- IUPAC name: 3-(9,9-dimethylacridin-10-yl)-N-methylpropan-1-amine
- CAS Number: 4757-49-7
- PubChem CID: 145765
- ChemSpider: 128589
- UNII: 3FDC82890Y
- ChEMBL: ChEMBL2104752
- CompTox Dashboard (EPA): DTXSID40197201

Chemical and physical data
- Formula: C_{19}H_{24}N_{2}
- Molar mass: 280.415 g·mol^{−1}
- 3D model (JSmol): Interactive image
- SMILES: CC1(C2=CC=CC=C2N(C3=CC=CC=C31)CCCNC)C
- InChI: InChI=1S/C19H24N2/c1-19(2)15-9-4-6-11-17(15)21(14-8-13-20-3)18-12-7-5-10-16(18)19/h4-7,9-12,20H,8,13-14H2,1-3H3; Key:PGSOFANFWNSSRA-UHFFFAOYSA-N

Monometacrine (INN; developmental code name SD-735), also known as desmethyldimetacrine, is a drug of the tricyclic family described as an antidepressant which was never marketed. It was first described in the literature by 1966. The drug is the N-desmethyl analogue of dimetacrine and is a metabolite of dimetacrine.
