= Atropine/diphenoxylate =

Pharmaceutical drug combination for diarrhea

Combination of
- Diphenoxylate: Mu opiate receptor agonist
- Atropine: Muscarinic acetylcholine receptors antagonist

Clinical data
- Trade names: Lomotil
- AHFS/Drugs.com: Professional Drug Facts
- License data: US DailyMed: Diphenoxylate hydrochloride and atropine sulfate
- Pregnancy category: AU: C
- Routes of administration: By mouth
- ATC code: None

Legal status
- Legal status: UK: POM (Prescription only); US: Schedule V

Identifiers
- CAS Number: 55840-97-6
- PubChem CID: 23724775
- ChemSpider: none
- KEGG: D00301
- ChEBI: CHEBI:6519

Diphenoxylate/atropine, also known as co-phenotrope and sold under the brand name Lomotil among others, is used to treat diarrhea. It is a fixed-dose combination of the medications diphenoxylate, as the hydrochloride, an antidiarrheal; and atropine, as the sulfate, an anticholinergic. It is taken by mouth. Onset is typically within an hour.

Side effects may include abdominal pain, angioedema, glaucoma, heart problems, feeling tired, dry mouth, and trouble seeing. It is unclear if use in pregnancy is safe and use when breastfeeding may result in side effects in the baby. It works by decreasing contractions of the bowel.

The combination was approved for medical use in the United States in 1960. It is available as a generic medication. In 2023, it was the 286th most commonly prescribed medication in the United States, with more than 600,000 prescriptions. The combination is classified as a Schedule V controlled substance in the United States.

== Contraindications ==
Contraindications include:

- People under six years of age
- People with an allergy to diphenoxylate or atropine
- People with diarrhea associated with pseudomembranous enterocolitis (Clostridioides difficile), diarrhea caused by antibiotic treatment
- People with obstructive jaundice

== Side effects ==
The combination is generally safe for short-term use and with recommended dosage. In doses used for the treatment of diarrhea, whether acute or chronic, diphenoxylate has not produced addiction.

It may cause several side-effects, such as dry mouth, headache, constipation and blurred vision. It is not recommended for children under six years of age.

== Interactions ==
Interactions with other drugs:

- Antidepressants (e.g. Elavil, Prozac)
- Monoamine oxidase inhibitors (e.g. Nardil, Parnate)
- Opioid analgesics
- Sedatives (e.g. Ambien, Sonata)

Diarrhea that is caused by some antibiotics such as cefaclor, erythromycin or tetracycline can worsen.

== Toxicity ==
It may cause serious health problems when overdosed. Signs and symptoms of adverse effects may include any or several of the following: convulsions, respiratory depression (slow or stopped breathing), dilated eye pupils, nystagmus (rapid side-to-side eye movements), erythema (flushed skin), gastrointestinal constipation, nausea, vomiting, paralytic ileus, tachycardia (rapid pulse), drowsiness and hallucinations. Symptoms of toxicity may take up to 12 hours to appear.

Treatment of overdose must be initiated immediately after diagnosis and may include the following: ingestion of activated charcoal, laxative and a counteracting medication (narcotic antagonist).

== Mechanism of action ==
Diphenoxylate is anti-diarrheal and atropine is anticholinergic. A subtherapeutic amount of atropine sulfate is present to discourage deliberate overdosage. Atropine has no anti-diarrheal properties, but will cause tachycardia when overused. The medication diphenoxylate works by slowing down the movement of the intestines. In some cases it has been shown to ease symptoms of opiate withdrawal.

== History ==
Diphenoxylate was developed in 1954 as part of US Navy and CIA-funded research on nonaddictive substitutes for codeine.

== Society and culture ==
=== Legal status ===
In the United States, it is classified as a Schedule V controlled substance by federal law, and is available only for a medical purpose.

=== Names ===
The UK British Approved Name (BAN) name for diphenoxylate and atropine is co-phenotrope.

As of 2018, the combination is marketed in the US and some other countries under the brands Atridol, Atrolate, Atrotil, Co-Phenotrope, Dhamotil, Dimotil, Intard, Logen, Lomanate, Lomotil, Lonox, and Reasec.
