= Morolimumab =

Monoclonal antibody

Monoclonal antibody
- Type: Whole antibody
- Source: Human
- Target: RhD

Clinical data
- ATC code: none

Identifiers
- CAS Number: 202833-07-6
- ChemSpider: none
- UNII: R6LF24NKU4

Morolimumab is a human monoclonal antibody against the human Rhesus factor.
