= Meluadrine =

Abandoned tocolytic drug

Clinical data
- Other names: HSR-81; (R)-4-Hydroxytulobuterol
- Drug class: Sympathomimetic; Tocolytic; β_{2}-Adrenergic receptor agonist

Identifiers
- IUPAC name: 4-[(1R)-2-(tert-butylamino)-1-hydroxyethyl]-3-chlorophenol
- CAS Number: 134865-33-1 134865-37-5 (tartrate)
- PubChem CID: 3045414
- ChemSpider: 142963
- UNII: FYC8314117
- ChEMBL: ChEMBL2104709
- CompTox Dashboard (EPA): DTXSID8048810

Chemical and physical data
- Formula: C_{12}H_{18}ClNO_{2}
- Molar mass: 243.73 g·mol^{−1}
- 3D model (JSmol): Interactive image
- SMILES: CC(C)(C)NC[C@@H](C1=C(C=C(C=C1)O)Cl)O
- InChI: InChI=1S/C12H18ClNO2/c1-12(2,3)14-7-11(16)9-5-4-8(15)6-10(9)13/h4-6,11,14-16H,7H2,1-3H3/t11-/m0/s1; Key:LIXBJWRFCNRAPA-NSHDSACASA-N

Meluadrine (INN), also known as meluadrine tartrate (JAN; developmental code name HSR-81) in the case of the tartrate salt, is a sympathomimetic and β_{2}-adrenergic receptor agonist which was studied as a tocolytic drug but was never marketed. It was first described in the literature by 1994. The drug is also known as (R)-4-hydroxytulobuterol and is an active metabolite of tulobuterol.
