= Medrylamine =

Chemical compound

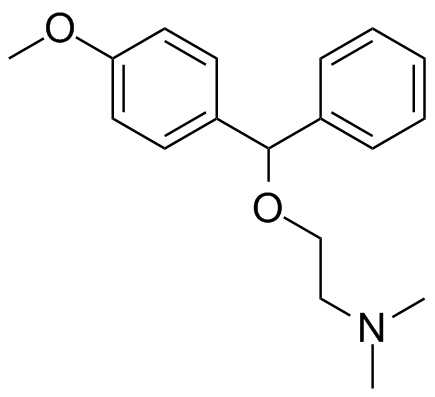

Identifiers
- IUPAC name: 2-[(4-methoxyphenyl)-phenylmethoxy]-N,N-dimethylethanamine
- CAS Number: 524-99-2
- PubChem CID: 10669
- ChemSpider: 10219
- UNII: 5R003655CR
- ChEBI: CHEBI:135181
- ChEMBL: ChEMBL2104714
- CompTox Dashboard (EPA): DTXSID10862116
- ECHA InfoCard: 100.007.609

Chemical and physical data
- Formula: C_{18}H_{23}NO_{2}
- Molar mass: 285.387 g·mol^{−1}
- 3D model (JSmol): Interactive image
- SMILES: CN(C)CCOC(c1ccccc1)c2ccc(cc2)OC
- InChI: InChI=InChI=1S/C18H23NO2/c1-19(2)13-14-21-18(15-7-5-4-6-8-15)16-9-11-17(20-3)12-10-16/h4-12,18H,13-14H2,1-3H3; Key:BXCMCXBSUDRYPF-UHFFFAOYSA-N

Medrylamine is an antihistamine related to diphenhydramine.
