= Mucoactive agent =

Drugs that clear mucus from airways

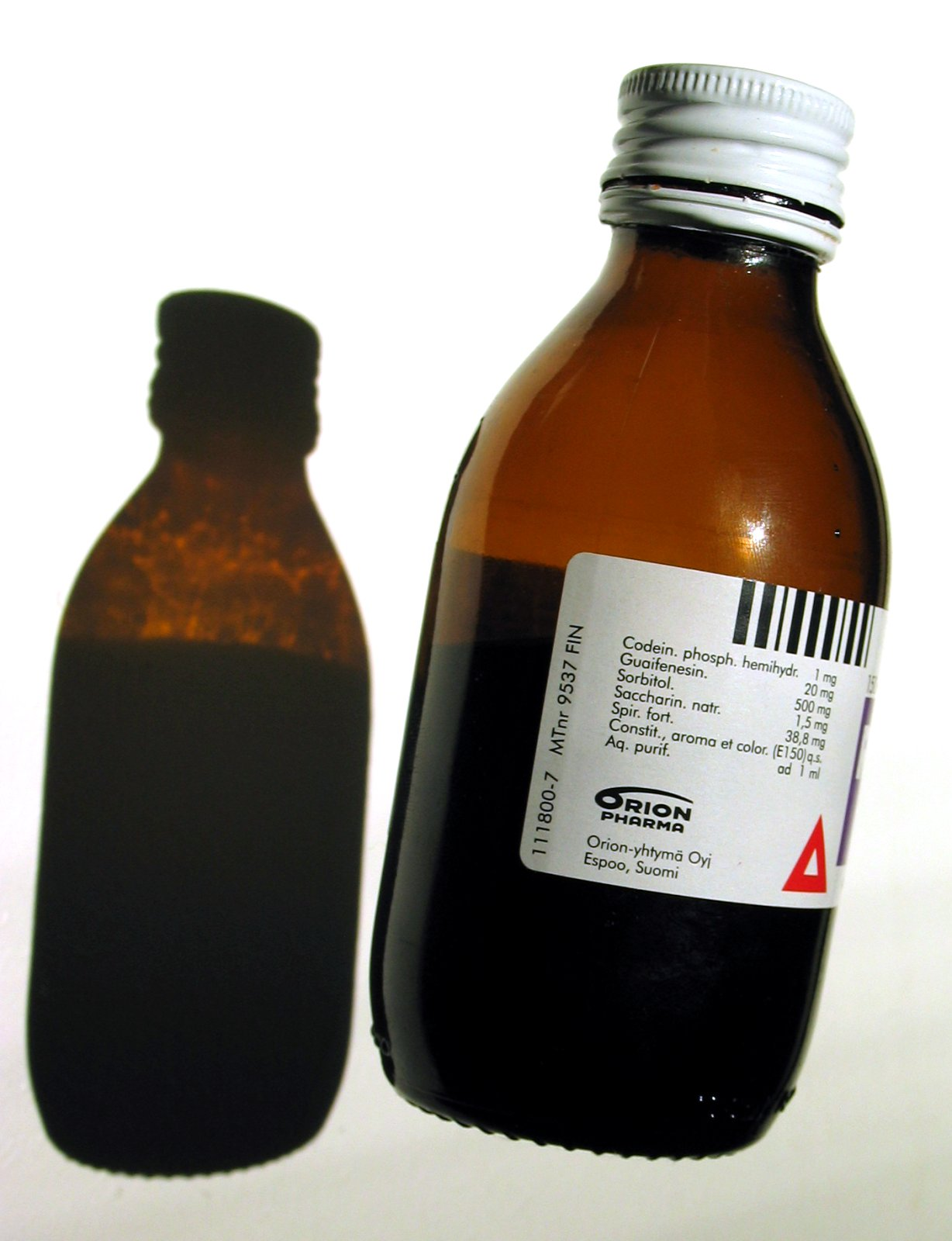
Cough medicines usually contain mucoactive agents

Mucoactive agents are a class of pharmacologic agents that include expectorants, mucolytics, mucoregulators, and mucokinetics that can affect the volume, viscosity, transportation, and composition of mucus or sputum. They often aid in clearing mucus or sputum from the upper and lower airways. These medications are used to treat respiratory diseases complicated by the oversecretion or inspissation of mucus. These drugs can be further categorized by their mechanism of action.

== Mechanism of action ==
Mucoactive agents—expectorants—include mucolytics, secretolytics and mucokinetics (also called secretomotorics)

- Mucolytics: thin (reduce the viscosity of) mucus
- Secretolytics: increase airway water or the volume of airway secretions
- Mucokinetics: increase mucociliary transport (clearance) and transportability of mucus by cough
- Mucoregulators: suppress underlying mechanisms of mucus hypersecretion

Alternatively, attacking the affinity between secretions and the biological surfaces is another avenue, which is used by abhesives and surfactants.

Any of these effects could improve airway clearance during coughing.

In general, clearance ability is hampered by the bonding to surfaces (stickiness) and by the viscosity of mucous secretions in the lungs. In turn, the viscosity is dependent upon the concentration of mucoprotein in the secretions.

Mucolytics, secretolytics and secretomotorics are different types of medication, yet they are intended to promote drainage of mucus from the lungs.

An expectorant (from the Latin expectorare, to expel or banish) works by signaling the body to increase the amount or hydration of secretions, resulting in more, yet clearer, secretions and lubricating the irritated respiratory tract. One mucoactive agent, guaifenesin, has anxiolytic and muscle-relaxing properties. It is commonly available in cough syrups and also as sustained-release tablets.

Mucolytics can dissolve thick mucus and are usually used to help relieve respiratory difficulties. They do this by breaking down the chemical bonds between molecules in the mucus. This in turn can lower the viscosity by altering the mucin-containing components.

An expectorant increases bronchial secretions and mucolytics help loosen thick bronchial secretions. Expectorants reduce the thickness or viscosity of bronchial secretions, thus increasing mucus flow that can be removed more easily through coughing. Mucolytics break down the chemical structure of mucus molecules. The mucus becomes thinner and can be removed more easily through coughing.

— Adams, Holland, & Bostwick, 2008, p. 591

== Mucoactive drugs ==
- Thiols
  - acetylcysteine
  - mesna
  - fexlamose (investigational)
- Thioesters
  - carbocisteine
  - erdosteine
  - mecysteine
- Bromhexine-like
  - ambroxol
  - bromhexine
- DNAse
  - dornase alpha
- Irritative secretolytics
  - ammonium chloride (not believed to work by the FDA)
- Citrates
  - potassium citrate
  - sodium citrate (not believed to work by the FDA)
- Iodides
  - Potassium iodide
- Plant-derived compounds or extracts
  - guaifenesin (does not work in upper respiratory tract infections)
  - terpin hydrate (not believed to work by the FDA)
  - tolu balsam (not believed to work by the FDA)
  - Justicia adhatoda extracts
