= Radioiodinated serum albumin =

Radioiodinated serum albumin, abbreviated RISA, is a marker used in identifying blood plasma via the dilution method in renal physiology.
