= Maslimomab =

Monoclonal antibody

Monoclonal antibody
- Type: ?
- Source: Mouse
- Target: T-cell receptor

Clinical data
- ATC code: none

Identifiers
- CAS Number: 127757-92-0
- ChemSpider: none
- UNII: 6A29UE2ZGG

Maslimomab is a mouse monoclonal antibody and an immunosuppressive drug. It is an anti-human T-cell receptor alpha/beta chain.
