= Autologous cultured chondrocytes on porcine collagen membrane =

Treatment to correct cartilage defects in the knee

- Other names: MACI
- Specialty: Orthopedic

Autologous cultured chondrocytes on porcine collagen membrane
Clinical data
- Trade names: Maci
- License data: US DailyMed: Maci
- ATC code: none

Legal status
- Legal status: US: ℞-only

Identifiers
- DrugBank: DB10997
- UNII: D5P3K3V822

Autologous cultured chondrocytes on porcine collagen membrane (Maci) is a treatment to correct cartilage defects in the knee. It is used to treat symptomatic, full-thickness cartilage defects of the knee with or without bone involvement. Autologous cultured chondrocytes on porcine collagen membrane is an autologous cellularized scaffold product. This treatment is approved by the US Food and Drug Administration (FDA). It is only administered to adults. Healthy cartilage is removed from the person's own knees and a 'scaffold' is created on which the healthy tissue growths. This is an autologous matrix-induced chondrogenesis procedure which prevents tissue rejection complications since the transplanted cartilage comes from the same person.

Autologous cultured chondrocytes on porcine collagen membrane was approved for use in the United States in May 2019.

== See also ==
- Microfracturing
- Knee osteoarthritis
- Knee pain
