= Cysteine methyl ester =

Chemical compound

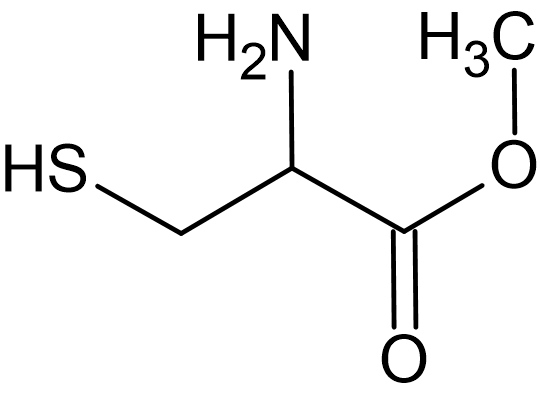

Clinical data
- Other names: Methyl L-cysteinate
- AHFS/Drugs.com: International Drug Names

Identifiers
- IUPAC name: methyl (2R)-2-amino-3-sulfanylpropanoate
- CAS Number: 2485-62-3
- PubChem CID: 29145
- ChemSpider: 27113
- UNII: RQ6L463N3B
- KEGG: D08164
- ChEBI: CHEBI:41531
- ChEMBL: ChEMBL1231844
- CompTox Dashboard (EPA): DTXSID8048365
- ECHA InfoCard: 100.017.842

Chemical and physical data
- Formula: C_{4}H_{9}NO_{2}S
- Molar mass: 135.18 g·mol^{−1}
- 3D model (JSmol): Interactive image
- SMILES: COC(=O)C(CS)N
- InChI: InChI=1S/C4H9NO2S/c1-7-4(6)3(5)2-8/h3,8H,2,5H2,1H3/t3-/m0/s1; Key:MCYHPZGUONZRGO-VKHMYHEASA-N

Cysteine methyl ester is the organic compound with the formula HSCH_{2}CH(NH_{2})CO_{2}CH_{3}. It is a white solid substance, known as the methyl ester of the amino acid, cysteine.

== Uses ==
Under the brand name Mecysteine, cysteine methyl ester is a commercial drug for mucolytic activity. The compound has an ability to break down or lower the viscosity of mucin-containing secretions or components of fluids by chronic and acute respiratory disorders. The drug is sold under the commercial names Delta in Paraguay, and Pectite and Zeotin in Japan.

Cysteine methyl ester is also used as a building block for synthesis of N,S-heterocycles.
