= Monteplase =

Pharmaceutical compound

Monteplase is an antithrombic proposed for use in acute myocardial infarction.
