= Tropicamide/phenylephrine =

Medication

Combination of
- Tropicamide: Anticholinergic
- Phenylephrine: Alpha-1 adrenergic receptor agonist

Clinical data
- Trade names: Mydcombi
- Routes of administration: Topical, ophthalmic
- ATC code: S01FA56 (WHO)

Legal status
- Legal status: US: ℞-only

Tropicamide/phenylephrine, sold under the brand name Mydcombi is a fixed dose combination of tropicamide and phenylephrine used to dilate the eyes (mydriasis). It contains, tropicamide, an anticholinergic, and phenylephrine, as the hydrochloride, an alpha-1 adrenergic receptor agonist. It is sprayed into the eyes.

It was approved for medical use in the United States in May 2023.

== Medical uses ==
Tropicamide/phenylephrine is used for the short-term dilation of the pupils.
