= Mannomustine =

Chemical compound

Clinical data
- Trade names: Degranol
- Pregnancy category: AU: D
- Routes of administration: Intramuscular
- ATC code: L01

Legal status
- Legal status: In general: ℞ (Prescription only)

Pharmacokinetic data
- Metabolism: Hepatic
- Excretion: Renal

Identifiers
- IUPAC name: (2-chloroethyl)({6-[(2-chloroethyl)amino]-2,3,4,5-tetrahydroxyhexyl})amine
- CAS Number: 576-68-1 551-74-6
- PubChem CID: 3033867
- ChemSpider: 2298447
- UNII: E60VWA40D2
- CompTox Dashboard (EPA): DTXSID9020798
- ECHA InfoCard: 100.008.551

Chemical and physical data
- Formula: C_{10}H_{24}Cl_{4}N_{2}O_{4}
- Molar mass: 378.11 g·mol^{−1}
- 3D model (JSmol): Interactive image
- SMILES: ClCCNC[C@@H](O)[C@@H](O)[C@H](O)[C@H](O)CNCCCl
- InChI: InChI=1S/C10H22Cl2N2O4/c11-1-3-13-5-7(15)9(17)10(18)8(16)6-14-4-2-12/h7-10,13-18H,1-6H2/t7-,8-,9-,10-/m1/s1; Key:MQXVYODZCMMZEM-ZYUZMQFOSA-N

Mannomustine (INN), also known as mannitol nitrogen mustard, tradename Degranol is an old alkylating antineoplastic agent from the group of nitrogen mustards. It was first synthesized and characterized in 1957 by Vargha et al.

The mechanism of antineoplastic activity of mannomustine, like for all other alkylating agents, lies in its ability to alkylate DNA guanine nucleobases and, thus, to prevent uncoupling of DNA strands, which is a required step for any cell to divide.

Mannomustine was, at the time of its creation as a drug, claimed to be considerably less toxic than mechlorethamine. For example, the LD_{50} in rats, for intravenous mannomustine administration route, is claimed to be about 56 mg/kg.

== See also ==
- Mannitol
