= Merafloxacin =

Chemical compound

Identifiers
- IUPAC name: 1-Ethyl-7-[3-(ethylaminomethyl)pyrrolidin-1-yl]-6,8-difluoro-4-oxoquinoline-3-carboxylic acid
- CAS Number: 91188-00-0
- PubChem CID: 121833
- ChemSpider: 108697
- UNII: G6U51T1K77
- ChEMBL: ChEMBL6209
- CompTox Dashboard (EPA): DTXSID40869517

Chemical and physical data
- Formula: C_{19}H_{23}F_{2}N_{3}O_{3}
- Molar mass: 379.408 g·mol^{−1}
- 3D model (JSmol): Interactive image
- SMILES: CCNCC1CCN(C1)C2=C(C=C3C(=C2F)N(C=C(C3=O)C(=O)O)CC)F
- InChI: InChI=1S/C19H23F2N3O3/c1-3-22-8-11-5-6-24(9-11)17-14(20)7-12-16(15(17)21)23(4-2)10-13(18(12)25)19(26)27/h7,10-11,22H,3-6,8-9H2,1-2H3,(H,26,27); Key:BAYYCLWCHFVRLV-UHFFFAOYSA-N

Merafloxacin is a fluoroquinolone antibacterial that inhibits the pseudoknot formation which is necessary for the frameshift in the SARS-CoV-2 genome. It is a promising drug candidate for SARS-CoV-2.
