= Meclocycline =

Chemical compound

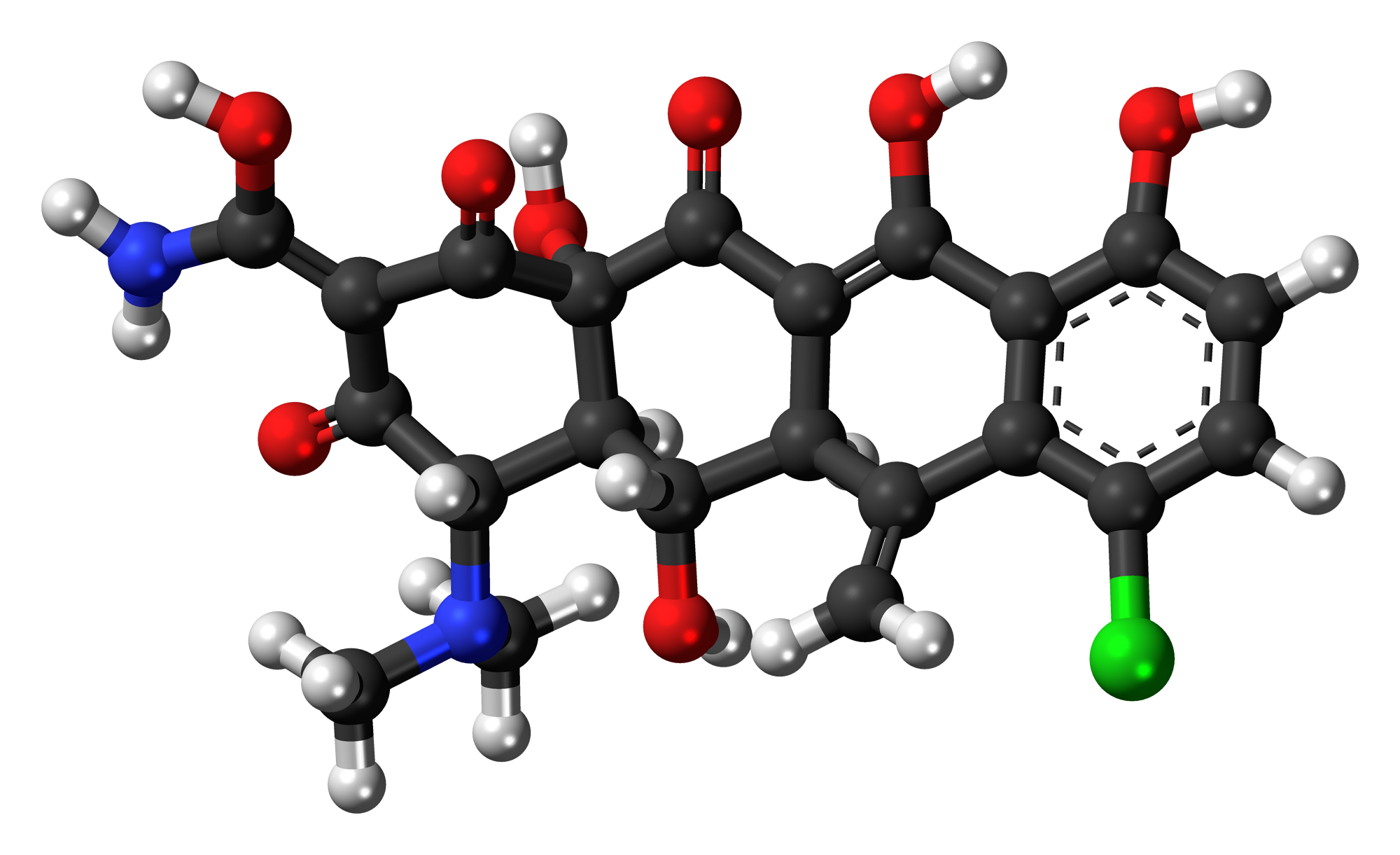

Clinical data
- AHFS/Drugs.com: Micromedex Detailed Consumer Information
- ATC code: D10AF04 (WHO)

Legal status
- Legal status: In general: ℞ (Prescription only)

Identifiers
- IUPAC name: (2E,4S,4aR,5S,5aR,12aS)-2-[Amino(hydroxy)methylene]-7-chloro-4-(dimethylamino)-5,10,11,12a-tetrahydroxy-6-methylene-4a,5a,6,12a-tetrahydrotetracene-1,3,12(2H,4H,5H)-trione
- CAS Number: 2013-58-3
- PubChem CID: 54676539
- ChemSpider: 16735890
- UNII: 23Q8M2HE6S
- KEGG: D02476
- ChEMBL: ChEMBL1237124
- CompTox Dashboard (EPA): DTXSID4048567
- ECHA InfoCard: 100.016.309

Chemical and physical data
- Formula: C_{22}H_{21}ClN_{2}O_{8}
- Molar mass: 476.87 g·mol^{−1}
- 3D model (JSmol): Interactive image
- SMILES: CN(C)[C@H]1[C@@H]2[C@H]([C@@H]3C(=C)C4=C(C=CC(=C4C(=O)C3=C([C@@]2(C(=O)C(=C1O)C(=O)N)O)O)O)Cl)O
- InChI: InChI=1S/C22H21ClN2O8/c1-6-9-7(23)4-5-8(26)11(9)16(27)12-10(6)17(28)14-15(25(2)3)18(29)13(21(24)32)20(31)22(14,33)19(12)30/h4-5,10,14-15,17,26,28-30,33H,1H2,2-3H3,(H2,24,32)/t10-,14-,15+,17+,22+/m1/s1; Key:GGQJXCQBBONZFX-IWVLMIASSA-N

Meclocycline (INN) is a tetracycline antibiotic. It is used topically (i.e. for skin infections) as it is totally insoluble in water and may cause liver and kidney damage if given systemically.

Its production for medical use has been discontinued. It was previously sold in the United States by Pfizer under the brand name Meclan.
