= Malotilate =

Chemical compound

Clinical data
- AHFS/Drugs.com: International Drug Names
- Routes of administration: By mouth
- ATC code: none

Legal status
- Legal status: Experimental(?)

Identifiers
- IUPAC name: diisopropyl 1,3-dithiol-2-ylidenemalonate
- CAS Number: 59937-28-9
- PubChem CID: 4006
- ChemSpider: 3866
- UNII: RV59PND975
- ChEMBL: ChEMBL1697754
- CompTox Dashboard (EPA): DTXSID7046463
- ECHA InfoCard: 100.056.334

Chemical and physical data
- Formula: C_{12}H_{16}O_{4}S_{2}
- Molar mass: 288.38 g·mol^{−1}
- 3D model (JSmol): Interactive image
- SMILES: CC(C)OC(=O)C(=C1SC=CS1)C(=O)OC(C)C
- InChI: InChI=1S/C12H16O4S2/c1-7(2)15-10(13)9(11(14)16-8(3)4)12-17-5-6-18-12/h5-8H,1-4H3; Key:YPIQVCUJEKAZCP-UHFFFAOYSA-N

Malotilate (INN) is a drug that has been used in studies for the treatment of liver disease. It has been shown to facilitate liver regeneration in rats.
