= Myrtecaine =

Local Anaesthetic

Clinical data
- Trade names: Algesal, Algésal Suractivé
- Other names: Nopoxamine
- ATC code: none

Identifiers
- IUPAC name: 2-[2-(6,6-Dimethyl-2-bicyclo[3.1.1]hept-2-enyl)ethoxy]-N,N-diethylethanamine
- CAS Number: 7712-50-7
- PubChem CID: 71851
- ChemSpider: 64868
- UNII: 9902116282
- ChEBI: CHEBI:135096
- CompTox Dashboard (EPA): DTXSID901016796
- ECHA InfoCard: 100.028.851

Chemical and physical data
- Formula: C_{17}H_{31}NO
- Molar mass: 265.441 g·mol^{−1}
- 3D model (JSmol): Interactive image
- SMILES: CCN(CC)CCOCCC1=CCC2CC1C2(C)C
- InChI: InChI=1S/C17H31NO/c1-5-18(6-2)10-12-19-11-9-14-7-8-15-13-16(14)17(15,3)4/h7,15-16H,5-6,8-13H2,1-4H3; Key:BZRYYBWNOUALTQ-UHFFFAOYSA-N

Myrtecaine (Nopoxamine), sold as a combination product with diethylamine salicylate under the trade name Algesal and Algésal Suractivé among others, is a local anaesthetic in the form of a topical cream, or with laurilsulfate in rubefacient preparations. It is used to treat muscle strains, tendinitis or ligament sprains and joint pain. It is a surface anaesthetic, adds to the analgesic and anti-inflammatory actions of diethylamine salicylate by facilitating its penetration. Also myrtecaine has a muscle relaxant effect.
