= 1H-LSD =

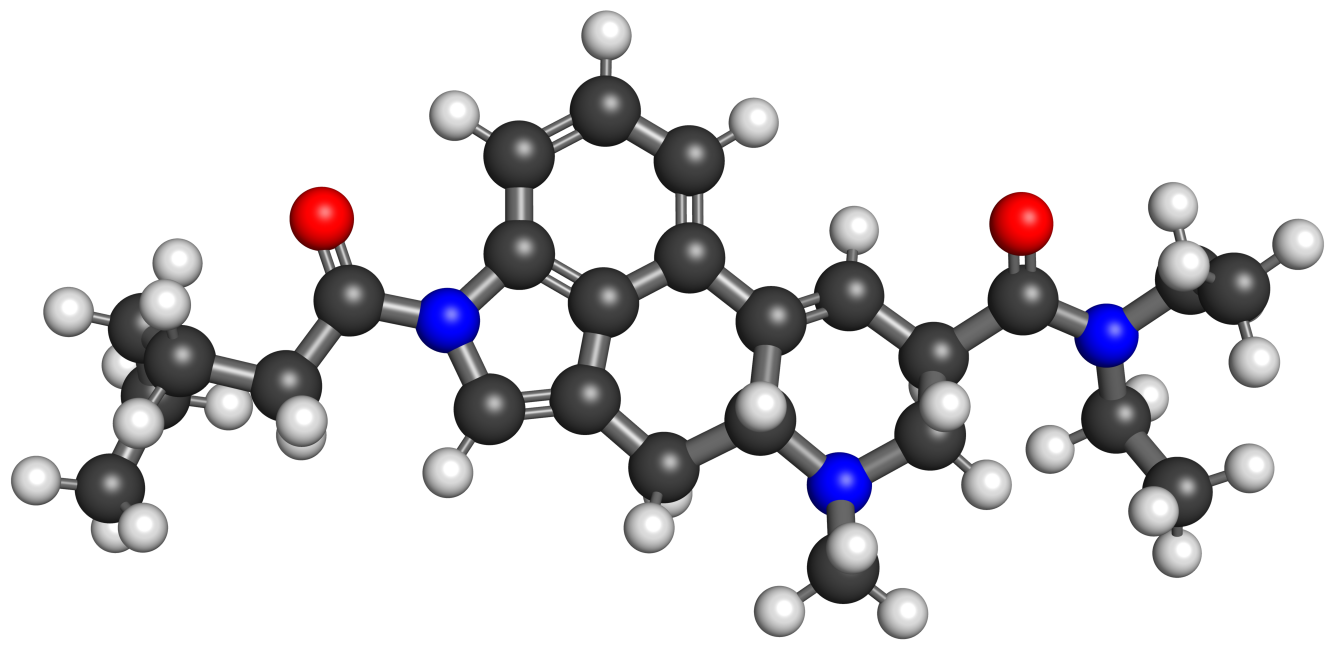

Clinical data
- Other names: 1-Hexanoyl-LSD; SYN-L-027

Legal status
- Legal status: DE: NpSG (Industrial and scientific use only); UK: Under Psychoactive Substances Act; US: Unscheduled (may be covered by the Federal Analogue Act if sold for human consumption); UN: Unscheduled

Identifiers
- IUPAC name: (6aR,9R)-N,N-diethyl-6-methyl-4-hexanoyl-4,6,6a,7,8,9-hexahydroindolo[4,3-fg]quinoline-9-carboxamide
- CAS Number: 3028949-65-4
- PubChem CID: 170763690

Chemical and physical data
- Formula: C_{26}H_{35}N_{3}O_{2}
- Molar mass: 421.585 g·mol^{−1}
- 3D model (JSmol): Interactive image
- SMILES: CN1CC(C=C2[C@H]1Cc1cn(C(=O)CCCCC)c3cccc2c31)C(=O)N(CC)CC
- InChI: InChI=1S/C26H35N3O2/c1-5-8-9-13-24(30)29-17-18-15-23-21(20-11-10-12-22(29)25(18)20)14-19(16-27(23)4)26(31)28(6-2)7-3/h10-12,14,17,19,23H,5-9,13,15-16H2,1-4H3/t19?,23-/m1/s1; Key:RSBBZALMPUUEKF-LEQGEALCSA-N

1H-LSD, also known as 1-hexanoyl-LSD or as SYN-L-027, is an acylated derivative of lysergic acid diethylamide (LSD), with a six carbon hexanoyl chain attached to the N1 position. It acts as a prodrug for LSD, and in animal studies produces drug-appropriate responding with a similar potency to short-chain homologues such as ALD-52 and 1P-LSD, in contrast to the 4 and 5 carbon homologues 1B-LSD and 1V-LSD which are several times weaker.

== Use and effects ==
1H-LSD produces similar effects to LSD with a shorter metabolic half-life. There are no documented cases of it being used recreationally.

== Chemistry ==
=== Analogues ===
Analogues of 1H-LSD include ALD-52 (1A-LSD), 1P-LSD, 1cP-LSD, 1DD-LSD, 1cP-AL-LAD, and 1P-ETH-LAD, among others.

== Society and culture ==
=== Legal status ===
==== Canada ====
1H-LSD is not an explicitly nor implicitly controlled substance in Canada as of 2025.

==== United States ====
1H-LSD is not an explicitly controlled substance in the United States. However, it could be considered a controlled substance under the Federal Analogue Act if intended for human consumption.

== See also ==
- Substituted lysergamide
- Lizard Labs
