= Monoctanoin =

Chemical compound

Clinical data
- Trade names: Moctanin
- Other names: 1-Mono-octanoin; glycerol monoctanoate; 1-monocaprylin; 1-monocapryloyl-rac-glycerol; 1-monooctanoin; 1-monooctanoylglycerol; caprylic acid α-monoglyceride; DL-1-monooctanoin; glyceryl 1-monooctanoate; octanoic acid 1-monoglyceride; α-monocaprylin
- AHFS/Drugs.com: Micromedex Detailed Consumer Information
- Routes of administration: Injection through catheter into bile duct
- ATC code: None

Legal status
- Legal status: Discontinued

Identifiers
- IUPAC name: 2,3-Dihydroxypropyl octanoate
- CAS Number: 502-54-5
- PubChem CID: 3033877
- DrugBank: DB06801
- ChemSpider: 2298454
- UNII: VFU0OU98LO
- KEGG: D05073
- CompTox Dashboard (EPA): DTXSID6048383
- ECHA InfoCard: 100.112.381

Chemical and physical data
- Formula: C_{11}H_{22}O_{4}
- Molar mass: 218.293 g·mol^{−1}
- 3D model (JSmol): Interactive image
- SMILES: O=C(OCC(O)CO)CCCCCCC
- InChI: InChI=1S/C11H22O4/c1-2-3-4-5-6-7-11(14)15-9-10(13)8-12/h10,12-13H,2-9H2,1H3; Key:GHBFNMLVSPCDGN-UHFFFAOYSA-N

Monoctanoin (or monocaprylin; trade name Moctanin) is a monoglyceride used to dissolve gallstones consisting of cholesterol. It is not available in the US any more.

The drug was given by injection through a catheter into the bile duct. Its most common adverse effects were abdominal or stomach pain, usually mild, or a burning sensation.
