= Co-danthrusate =

Pharmaceutical combination

Combination of
- Dantron: stimulant laxative
- Docusate: laxative

Identifiers
- CAS Number: 117-10-2
- ChemSpider: none
- UNII: Z4XE6IBF3V

Co-danthrusate is a combination of dantron and docusate. Dantron is a mild peristaltic stimulant which acts on the lower bowel to encourage normal bowel movement without causing irritation. It belongs to the group of medicines under the term stimulant laxative. It stimulates the nerves in the stomach wall, which causes the stomach muscles to contract. This medicine is used for analgesic-induced constipation. It takes six to twelve hours to work. This can cause discoloration of urine and bowel and liver tumors.

Co-danthramer is dantron plus poloxamer. It is (in the U.K.) only to be prescribed to terminally ill patients because of its carcinogenicity in rats. It is often prescribed to people taking long term opioid, because it relaxes the effect of opioid induced constipation. It will not alleviate the symptoms of opioid induced delayed gastric emptying and abdominal cramps.

== See also ==
- Laxative
- Opioid
