= Meclorisone =

Chemical compound

Clinical data
- Other names: NSC-92353; 16α-Methyldichlorisone; 9α,11β-Dichloro-17α,21-dihydroxy-16α-methylpregna-1,4-diene-3,20-dione
- Drug class: Corticosteroid; Glucocorticoid

Identifiers
- IUPAC name: (8S,9R,10S,11S,13S,14S,16R,17R)-9,11-Dichloro-17-hydroxy-17-(2-hydroxyacetyl)-10,13,16-trimethyl-6,7,8,11,12,14,15,16-octahydrocyclopenta[a]phenanthren-3-one
- CAS Number: 4732-48-3
- PubChem CID: 260706
- ChemSpider: 228830
- UNII: K18P43Q80N
- CompTox Dashboard (EPA): DTXSID60197102

Chemical and physical data
- Formula: C_{22}H_{28}Cl_{2}O_{4}
- Molar mass: 427.36 g·mol^{−1}
- 3D model (JSmol): Interactive image
- SMILES: C[C@@H]1C[C@H]2[C@@H]3CCC4=CC(=O)C=C[C@@]4([C@]3([C@H](C[C@@]2([C@]1(C(=O)CO)O)C)Cl)Cl)C
- InChI: InChI=1S/C22H28Cl2O4/c1-12-8-16-15-5-4-13-9-14(26)6-7-19(13,2)21(15,24)17(23)10-20(16,3)22(12,28)18(27)11-25/h6-7,9,12,15-17,25,28H,4-5,8,10-11H2,1-3H3/t12-,15+,16+,17+,19+,20+,21+,22+/m1/s1; Key:OKWSMPYQIYKVDC-CXSFZGCWSA-N

Meclorisone (developmental code name NSC-92353) is a synthetic glucocorticoid corticosteroid which was never marketed.
