= Mazapertine =

Names
- Preferred IUPAC name (Piperidin-1-yl){3-[(4-{2-[(propan-2-yl)oxy]phenyl}piperazin-1-yl)methyl]phenyl}methanone
- Other names RWJ-37796

Identifiers
CAS Number	134208-17-6
3D model (JSmol)	Interactive image
ChEMBL	ChEMBL10085
ChemSpider	54808
PubChem CID	60820
UNII	N0X1XW704P
CompTox Dashboard (EPA)	DTXSID40158594
- InChI: InChI=1S/C26H35N3O2/c1-21(2)31-25-12-5-4-11-24(25)28-17-15-27(16-18-28)20-22-9-8-10-23(19-22)26(30)29-13-6-3-7-14-29/h4-5,8-12,19,21H,3,6-7,13-18,20H2,1-2H3 Key: ZKZFPRUSWCYSGT-UHFFFAOYSA-N
- SMILES: O=C(N1CCCCC1)c2cc(ccc2)CN4CCN(c3ccccc3OC(C)C)CC4

Properties
Chemical formula	C_{26}H_{35}N_{3}O_{2}
Molar mass	421.585 g·mol^{−1}
- Except where otherwise noted, data are given for materials in their standard state (at 25 °C [77 °F], 100 kPa). Infobox references

Mazapertine (RWJ-37796) is an antipsychotic agent that was developed by Johnson & Johnson but never marketed. It exerts its pharmacological effect through affinity for dopamine D_{2}, serotonin 5-HT_{1A}, and α_{1}-adrenergic receptors.

Mazapertine is safe and well tolerated when administered orally.

Analogs of mazapertine with conformational restriction have been prepared and have greater affinity for the 5-HT_{1A} receptor.

== Synthesis ==
The laboratory synthesis of mazapertine has been reported. It begins with alkylation of 2-nitrophenol (1) with isopropyl bromide to give 2-isopropoxynitrobenzene (2). Catalytic hydrogenation of nitro group gives 2-isopropoxyaniline (3). Intermolecular ring formation of this aniline with bis(2-chloroethyl)amine yields 1-(2-isopropoxyphenyl)piperazine (4). Separately, amide formation of 3-(chloromethyl)benzoyl chloride (5) with piperidine gives 1-[3-(chloromethyl)benzoyl]piperidine (6). The last step is the convergent synthesis between the above two arms of the synthesis to afford the alkylation product mazapertine (7).

Synthesis of mazapertine
