= Mazipredone =

Chemical compound

Clinical data
- Trade names: Depersolon
- Other names: Depersolone; Methylpiperazinyl deoxyprednisolone; Deoxymethylpiperazinyl prednisolone; 11β,17α-Dihydroxy-21-(4-methyl-1-piperazinyl)pregna-1,4-diene-3,20-dione
- Drug class: Corticosteroid; Glucocorticoid

Identifiers
- IUPAC name: (8S,9S,10R,11S,13S,14S,17R)-11,17-Dihydroxy-10,13-dimethyl-17-[2-(4-methylpiperazin-1-yl)acetyl]-7,8,9,11,12,14,15,16-octahydro-6H-cyclopenta[a]phenanthren-3-one
- CAS Number: 13085-08-0
- PubChem CID: 6064
- ChemSpider: 5840
- UNII: QN0W2YSW63
- KEGG: D08158
- ChEBI: CHEBI:135721
- ChEMBL: ChEMBL2106858
- CompTox Dashboard (EPA): DTXSID30926941

Chemical and physical data
- Formula: C_{26}H_{38}N_{2}O_{4}
- Molar mass: 442.600 g·mol^{−1}
- 3D model (JSmol): Interactive image
- SMILES: C[C@]12C[C@@H]([C@H]3[C@H]([C@@H]1CC[C@@]2(C(=O)CN4CCN(CC4)C)O)CCC5=CC(=O)C=C[C@]35C)O
- InChI: InChI=1S/C26H38N2O4/c1-24-8-6-18(29)14-17(24)4-5-19-20-7-9-26(32,25(20,2)15-21(30)23(19)24)22(31)16-28-12-10-27(3)11-13-28/h6,8,14,19-21,23,30,32H,4-5,7,9-13,15-16H2,1-3H3/t19-,20-,21-,23+,24-,25-,26-/m0/s1; Key:CZBOZZDZNVIXFC-VRRJBYJJSA-N

Mazipredone (brand name Depersolon), also known as depersolone, is a synthetic glucocorticoid corticosteroid which is or has been marketed in the Czech Republic and Hungary.
