= British Approved Name =

Official name given to pharmaceutical substances

A British Approved Name (BAN) is the official, non-proprietary, or generic name given to a pharmaceutical substance, as defined in the British Pharmacopoeia (BP). The BAN is also the official name used in some countries around the world, because starting in 1953, proposed new names were evaluated by a panel of experts from WHO in conjunction with the BP commission to ensure naming consistency worldwide (an effort leading to the International Nonproprietary Name system). There is also a British Approved Name (Modified) (BANM).

== Combination preparations ==
BANs are unique in that names are assigned for combination preparations as well as single-drug preparations. For example, the BAN co-amoxiclav is assigned to preparations containing amoxicillin and clavulanic acid. Most other pharmacopoeias simply refer to combination products by both ingredients in the preparation, in this example "amoxicillin with clavulanic acid".

The prefix of "co-" is used for many combination drugs, including opioid with paracetamol or aspirin analgesics (e.g., co-codamol, co-codaprin, co-dydramol, co-proxamol); the anti-diarrhoeal, non-analgesic mixture of diphenoxylate and atropine, co-phenotrope (trade name Lomotil); antibiotics (e.g., co-fluampicil and co-trimoxazole); antihypertensives (e.g., co-tenidone); diuretics (e.g., co-amilofruse and co-amilozide); gastrointestinal drugs (e.g., co-danthrusate); and anti-Parkinsonism agents such as co-careldopa, co-beneldopa, and co-cyprindiol.

== BAN harmonisation ==
European Union legislation from 2001 required harmonisation of the BP with the European Pharmacopoeia (EP), as well as the adoption of International Nonproprietary Names through directives (2001/82/EC and 2001/83/EC, as amended, and 2003/63/EC). Across the EU has meant that, with the notable exception of adrenaline/epinephrine, BANs are now the same as the INNs. For example, the old BAN methicillin was replaced with the current BAN meticillin, matching the INN.

This has resulted in an interesting situation in other countries that use BANs. While the British Pharmacopoeia and BANs are the official pharmacopoeia/names defined by legislation in many of these countries, the former BANs often continue to be used, purportedly because of the difficulty of changeover. Despite the importance of the BP, there appears to be little or no movement in the direction of changing these names. In Australia, the Australian Approved Names are generally the same as BANs, but a few exceptions remain.

== See also ==
- British Pharmacopoeia
- International English food terms
- Nomenclature
- United States Adopted Name
