= Ketorfanol =

Chemical compound

Clinical data
- ATC code: None

Identifiers
- IUPAC name: 17-(Cyclopropylmethyl)-4-hydroxymorphinan-6-one
- CAS Number: 79798-39-3
- PubChem CID: 5490677
- ChemSpider: 16736742
- UNII: 8Z0ZXE70XL
- CompTox Dashboard (EPA): DTXSID60868547

Chemical and physical data
- Formula: C_{20}H_{25}NO_{2}
- Molar mass: 311.425 g·mol^{−1}
- 3D model (JSmol): Interactive image
- SMILES: C1CC1CN2CCC34CC(=O)CCC3C2CC5=C4C(=CC=C5)O
- InChI: InChI=1S/C20H25NO2/c22-15-6-7-16-17-10-14-2-1-3-18(23)19(14)20(16,11-15)8-9-21(17)12-13-4-5-13/h1-3,13,16-17,23H,4-12H2/t16-,17+,20-/m0/s1; Key:ORMBBVGVPWUEMQ-QKLQHJQFSA-N

Ketorfanol (INN, USAN) (developmental code name SBW-22), or ketorphanol, is an opioid analgesic of the morphinan family that was found to possess "potent antiwrithing activity" in animal assays but was never marketed. It is a 17-cycloalkylmethyl derivative of morphinan and as such, is closely related structurally to butorphanol, cyclorphan, oxilorphan, proxorphan, and xorphanol, which act preferentially as κ-opioid receptor agonists and to a lesser extent as μ-opioid receptor partial agonists/antagonists.

== See also ==
- Butorphanol
- Levallorphan
- Levomethorphan
- Levorphanol
- Nalbuphine
- Xorphanol
