= Proxorphan =

Chemical compound

Clinical data
- ATC code: None

Identifiers
- IUPAC name: 17-(Cyclopropylmethyl)-6-oxamorphinan-3-ol or (1S,9R,10R)-17-(cyclopropylmethyl)-13-oxa-17-azatetracyclo[7.5.3.0~1,10~.0~2,7~]heptadeca-2,4,6-trien-4-ol
- CAS Number: 69815-38-9
- PubChem CID: 5361874
- ChemSpider: 21476727
- UNII: TFE8T279QV
- CompTox Dashboard (EPA): DTXSID90990082

Chemical and physical data
- Formula: C_{19}H_{25}NO_{2}
- Molar mass: 299.414 g·mol^{−1}
- 3D model (JSmol): Interactive image
- SMILES: c1cc2c(cc1O)C34CCN(C(C2)C3CCOC4)CC5CC5

Proxorphan (INN), also known as proxorphan tartate (USAN) (developmental code name BL-5572M), is an opioid analgesic and antitussive drug of the morphinan family that was never marketed. It acts preferentially as a κ-opioid receptor partial agonist and to a lesser extent as a μ-opioid receptor partial agonist.

== Synthesis ==
T. A. Montzka, J. D. Matiskella and R. A. Partyka, U.S. patent 4,246,413; Chem. Abstr. 95, 43442z (1981).

Starting material for this preparation is ketoester 1, available by one of the classical benzomorphan syntheses. Condensation with the ylide from Triethyl phosphonoacetate (HWE reaction) affords diester 2. Catalytic hydrogenation proceeds from the less hindered face to afford the corresponding saturated diester (3). The esters are then reduced by means of LiAlH_{4} to give the glycol (4); this undergoes internal ether formation on treatment with acid to form the pyran ring of 5. Von Braun reaction with BrCN (or ethyl chloroformate) followed by saponification of the intermediate leads to the 2° amine (6). This is converted to the cyclopropylmethyl derivative 8 by acylation with cyclopropylcarbonyl chloride followed by reduction of the thus formed amide (7) with LiAlH_{4}. Cleaving off the O-methyl ether with sodium ethanethiol affords proxorphan (9).

== See also ==
- Butorphanol
- Cyclorphan
- Ketorfanol
- Levallorphan
- Levomethorphan
- Levorphanol
- Moxazocine
- Nalbuphine
- Oxilorphan
- Xorphanol
