= Xorphanol =

Opioid analgesic

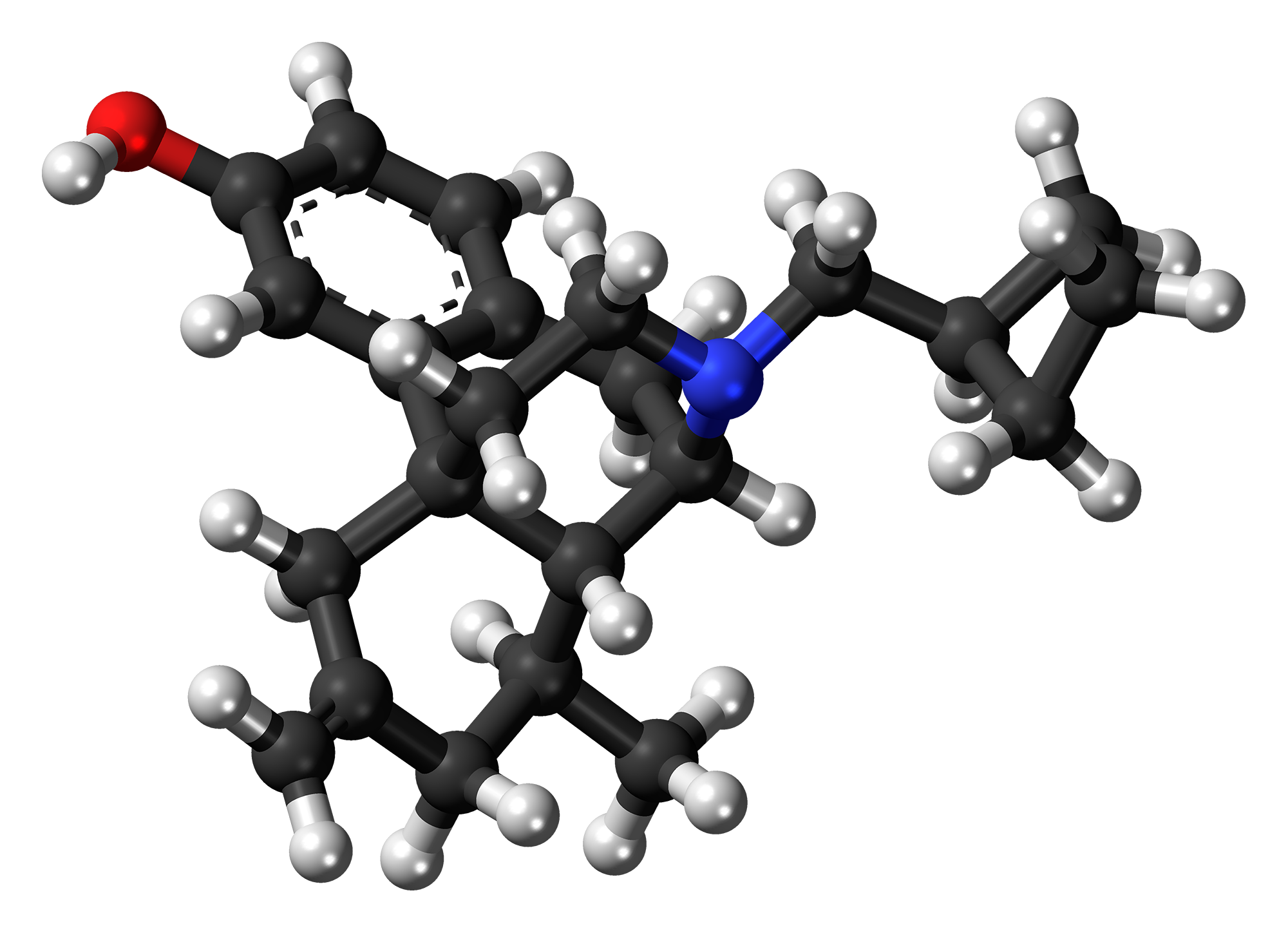

Clinical data
- ATC code: none

Identifiers
- IUPAC name: N-(Cyclobutylmethyl)-8β-methyl-6-methylenemorphinan-3-ol
- CAS Number: 77287-89-9
- PubChem CID: 5488631
- ChemSpider: 20121496
- UNII: L415991P58

Chemical and physical data
- Formula: C_{23}H_{31}NO
- Molar mass: 337.507 g·mol^{−1}
- 3D model (JSmol): Interactive image
- SMILES: C[C@H]1CC(=C)C[C@@]23[C@@H]1[C@@H](CC4=C2C=C(C=C4)O)N(CC3)CC5CCC5
- InChI: InChI=1S/C23H31NO/c1-15-10-16(2)22-21-11-18-6-7-19(25)12-20(18)23(22,13-15)8-9-24(21)14-17-4-3-5-17/h6-7,12,16-17,21-22,25H,1,3-5,8-11,13-14H2,2H3/t16-,21+,22-,23+/m0/s1; Key:AZJPPZHRNFQRRE-AZIXLERZSA-N

Xorphanol (INN; also known as xorphanol mesylate (USAN); developmental codes TR-5379 or TR-5379M) is an opioid analgesic of the morphinan family that was never marketed.

Xorphanol is a mixed agonist–antagonist of opioid receptors, acting preferentially as a high-efficacy partial agonist/near-full agonist of the κ-opioid receptor (K_{i} = 0.4 nM; EC_{50} = 3.3 nM; I_{max} = 49%; IA = 0.84) and to a lesser extent as a partial agonist of the μ-opioid receptor (K_{i} = 0.25 nM; IC_{50} = 3.4 nM; I_{max} = 29%) with lower relative intrinsic activity and marked antagonistic potential (including the ability to antagonize morphine-induced effects and induce opioid withdrawal in opioid-dependent individuals). The drug has also been found to act as an agonist of the δ-opioid receptor (K_{i} = 1.0 nM; IC_{50} = 8 nM; I_{max} = 76%).

Xorphanol produces potent analgesia, and was originally claimed to possess a minimal potential for dependence or abuse. Moreover, side effects in animal studies were relatively mild, with only sedation and nausea being prominent, although it also produced convulsions at the highest dose tested. However, human trials revealed additional side effects such as headaches and euphoria, and this was the subject of a lawsuit between the drug's inventors and the company to which they had licensed the marketing rights, which claimed that these side effects had not been revealed to them during the license negotiations. As a result of this dispute, the drug was never marketed commercially.

It has been encountered as a novel designer drug.

== See also ==
- 6-Methylenedihydrodesoxymorphine
- Butorphanol
- Cyclorphan
- Ketorfanol
- Levallorphan
- Levomethorphan
- Levorphanol
- Nalmefene
- Nalbuphine
- Nalorphine
- Oxilorphan
- Proxorphan
