= Dextrallorphan =

Chemical compound

Clinical data
- Routes of administration: Oral
- ATC code: none

Legal status
- Legal status: In general: uncontrolled

Identifiers
- IUPAC name: (+)-(13α,14α)-17-allylmorphinan-3-ol
- CAS Number: 5822-43-5
- PubChem CID: 5748237
- ChemSpider: 2339009

Chemical and physical data
- Formula: C_{19}H_{25}NO
- Molar mass: 283.415 g·mol^{−1}
- 3D model (JSmol): Interactive image
- SMILES: Oc1ccc3c(c1)[C@]24[C@@H]([C@H](N(CC2)C\C=C)C3)CCCC4

Dextrallorphan (DXA) is a chemical of the morphinan class that is used in scientific research. It acts as a σ_{1} receptor agonist and NMDA receptor antagonist. It has no significant affinity for the σ_{2}, μ-opioid, or δ-opioid receptor, or for the serotonin or norepinephrine transporter. As an NMDA receptor antagonist, in vivo, it is approximately twice as potent as dextromethorphan, and five-fold less potent than dextrorphan.

== Uses in Scientific Research ==
=== Masking of sigma-1 receptor ===
Dextrallorphan is often used in research to block σ_{1} receptor sites so that σ_{2} receptor sites (which have not been cloned yet) can be studied. It was hypothesized that both of these sigma (σ) receptors were opioid receptors, due to their affinity for psychoactive drugs. However, it is now understood that they are non-opioid receptors that bind to certain psychoactive drugs, like dextrallorphan. One example of dextrallorphan being used to mask σ_{1} receptor sites was seen in a study on the localization of the σ_{2} receptor in detergent-resistant lipid raft domains. It has also been used to mask σ_{1} receptor sites so that σ_{2} receptor binding characteristics in the rat liver could be determined, by labeling σ_{2} receptor sites with [^{3}H]l,3-di-o-tolylguanidine (DTG) in the presence of 1 μM dextrallorphan solution.

=== Animal Studies ===
Dextrallorphan was used in Spraque-Dawley rats to study cerebellar Purkinje neurons electrophysical responses to the drug when it was applied iontophoretically as a sigma (σ) receptor ligand. Dextrallorphan increased the firing rate by 14%, suggesting that sigma (σ) ligands (like dextrallorphan) alter the spontaneous firing of Purkinje neurons and cause motor effects.

In another study, dextrallorphan, along with other opioid derivatives, was found to be a potent inhibitor of etorphine-inaccessible (EI) sites in the guinea-pig brain. Dextrallorphan was of the top three most potent opioid inhibitors of those studied, with a concentration of 67 nM required to show 50% inhibition.

=== History ===
In 1955, dextrallorphan has been used to study inhibition of cholinesterases and to look at the relationship between analgetics and acetylcholine metabolism. It was found that dextrallorphan inhibits 25% of bovine erythrocyte cholinesterase at a dose of 10^{−3} mole/liter, which corresponds to a concentration of up to 0.2 mg/kg in dog intestine. However, at this dose the drug showed no effect on the gut tone. Dextrallorphan was classified as a potent inhibitor of the intestinal and red blood cell cholinesterase based on the concentration of the drug needed to inhibit these enzymes in the cholinesterase preparations from the animals systems utilized. Simultaneously, dextrallorphan showed no analgesia and no change in intestinal tone. With these results dextrallorphan helped proved that there is no correlation between the inhibition of cholinesterase systems and analgetic or intestinal effects.

In 1979, dextrallorphan was found to have a half maximal inhibitory concentration (IC_{50}) for binding to the pituitary and brain receptor of 10,000 ± 1000 nM and 10,000 ± 1500 nM, respectively. While its stereoisomer, levallorphan, had a 10,000 times more potent dose, thus proving that binding to these receptors is stereospecific.

== See also ==
- Morphinan
- Oxilorphan
- Dextrorphan
- Dextromethorphan
- Levallorphan
