= Propallorphan =

Clinical data
- ATC code: none

Identifiers
- IUPAC name: (1R,9R,10R)-17-prop-2-ynyl-17-azatetracyclo[7.5.3.01,10.02,7]heptadeca-2(7),3,5-trien-4-ol
- PubChem CID: 6602241
- ChEMBL: ChEMBL1790045

Chemical and physical data
- Formula: C_{19}H_{23}NO
- Molar mass: 281.399 g·mol^{−1}
- 3D model (JSmol): Interactive image
- SMILES: C#CCN1CC[C@]23CCCC[C@H]2[C@H]1CC4=C3C=C(C=C4)O
- InChI: InChI=1S/C19H23NO/c1-2-10-20-11-9-19-8-4-3-5-16(19)18(20)12-14-6-7-15(21)13-17(14)19/h1,6-7,13,16,18,21H,3-5,8-12H2/t16-,18+,19+/m0/s1; Key:OKICQDFBWUMTDE-QXAKKESOSA-N

Propallorphan also known by numerous code names, some of the most prominent being RO-1-7780 (RO-7780) and NIH 6045, MCL-117 is an experimental drug of the substituted morphinan family that acts as an opioid antagonist.

== Pharmacology ==
=== Pharmacodynamics ===
Propallorphan has long been studied as an opioid (i.e., narcotic) antagonist, as confirmed by a 1956 study in which it was first described as RO-1-7780 and was shown to antagonize alphaprodine or morphine in dogs, and alphaprodine in humans. Simultaneous administration of RO-1-7780 with alphaprodine at a dose of 1/75 or 1/100 of the latter appeared to completely reverse the respiratory depression induced in dogs by the narcotic alone. At the same dose ratios of RO-1-7780 to alphaprodine in humans, the antagonist reduced the severity of alphaprodine-induced respiratory depression, while the overall narcotic effect was otherwise considered unchanged. Furthermore, a 1962 study reports that RO-1-7780 reverses the respiratory depressant effects of codeine, although twice the dose is required to achieve the same effect as levallorphan.

In a 1966 study, it was investigated alongside the known opioid antagonist nalorphine as a supplement to thiopental and nitrous oxide anesthesia. RO-1-7780 did not produce the marked respiratory depression observed following morphine administered in the same manner and at the same dose of 1.0 mg/kg. Propallorphan is much weaker in analgesia than the related compound levorphanol; its analgesic activity showed an EC_{50} of 38.9 mg/kg, with a duration of effect of 226 minutes. Propallorphan acts as a hallucinogen, as evidenced by the fact that its levorotatory isomer induces dysphoria and hallucinations—indeed, producing dysphoric and hallucinogenic effects comparable in intensity to those of nalorphine.

== Analogs ==
Levorotatory and dextrorotatory isomers of propallorphan

Propallorphan shares the tetracyclic ring skeleton of morphinan and a phenolic hydroxyl group at C-3 with levorphanol and levallorphan. The three compounds differ only in the substituent attached to the ring nitrogen atom at position-17. This group is methyl in levorphanol, allyl in levallorphan, and propargyl in propallorphan.
