= Oxilorphan =

Chemical compound

Clinical data
- ATC code: None

Identifiers
- IUPAC name: (-)-17-(Cyclopropylmethyl)-morphinan-3,14-diol
- CAS Number: 42281-59-4
- PubChem CID: 5361090
- ChemSpider: 16736680
- UNII: 9Y9J2J74TO
- KEGG: D05299
- CompTox Dashboard (EPA): DTXSID001009897
- ECHA InfoCard: 100.050.664

Chemical and physical data
- Formula: C_{20}H_{27}NO_{2}
- Molar mass: 313.441 g·mol^{−1}
- 3D model (JSmol): Interactive image
- SMILES: Oc3ccc4C[C@H]1N(CC[C@@]2(CCCC[C@@]12O)c4c3)CC5CC5
- InChI: InChI=1S/C20H27NO2/c22-16-6-5-15-11-18-20(23)8-2-1-7-19(20,17(15)12-16)9-10-21(18)13-14-3-4-14/h5-6,12,14,18,22-23H,1-4,7-11,13H2/t18-,19+,20-/m1/s1; Key:STBZIDOIKQNFCQ-HSALFYBXSA-N

Oxilorphan (INN, USAN) (developmental code name L-BC-2605) is an opioid antagonist of the morphinan family that was never marketed. It acts as a μ-opioid receptor (MOR) antagonist but a κ-opioid receptor (KOR) partial agonist, and has similar effects to naloxone and around the same potency as an MOR antagonist. Oxilorphan has some weak partial agonist actions at the MOR (with miosis, nausea, dizziness, and some euphoria observed) and can produce hallucinogenic/dissociative effects at sufficient doses, indicative of KOR activation. It was trialed for the treatment of opioid addiction, but was not developed commercially. The KOR agonist effects of oxilorphan are associated with dysphoria, which combined with its hallucinogenic effects, serve to limit its clinical usefulness; indeed, many patients who experienced these side effects refused to take additional doses in clinical trials. It has been encountered as a novel designer drug.

== See also ==
- Butorphanol
- Cyclorphan
- Ketorfanol
- Levallorphan
- Levomethorphan
- Levorphanol
- Nalbuphine
- Proxorphan
- Xorphanol
