= C16H21N =

The molecular formula C_{16}H_{21}N (molar mass: 227.34 g/mol, exact mass: 227.1674 u) may refer to:

- Hasubanan
- Morphinan
