= C19H21NO3 =

The molecular formula C_{19}H_{21}NO_{3} (molar mass: 311.37 g/mol, exact mass: 311.1521 u) may refer to:

- Nalorphine, also known as N-allylnormorphine
- 2-OH-NPA
- Thebaine, also known as paramorphine
