= C16H21NO =

The molecular formula C_{16}H_{21}NO (molar mass: 243.344 g/mol, exact mass: 243.1623 u) may refer to:

- 3-Hydroxymorphinan (3-HM), or morphinan-3-ol
- Norlevorphanol
