= Levophenacylmorphan =

Chemical compound

Clinical data
- Other names: Levophenacylmorphan
- ATC code: none

Legal status
- Legal status: BR: Class A1 (Narcotic drugs); CA: Schedule I; DE: Anlage I (Authorized scientific use only); US: Schedule I

Identifiers
- IUPAC name: (−)-3-Hydroxy-N-phenacylmorphinan
- CAS Number: 10061-32-2
- PubChem CID: 5362482
- ChemSpider: 16736786
- UNII: 7Q24AL2BR2
- KEGG: D12687
- CompTox Dashboard (EPA): DTXSID90881401
- ECHA InfoCard: 100.030.168

Chemical and physical data
- Formula: C_{24}H_{27}NO_{2}
- Molar mass: 361.485 g·mol^{−1}
- 3D model (JSmol): Interactive image
- SMILES: C1CC[C@@]23CCN([C@@H]([C@@H]2C1)CC4=C3C=C(C=C4)O)CC(=O)C5=CC=CC=C5
- InChI: InChI=1S/C24H27NO2/c26-19-10-9-18-14-22-20-8-4-5-11-24(20,21(18)15-19)12-13-25(22)16-23(27)17-6-2-1-3-7-17/h1-3,6-7,9-10,15,20,22,26H,4-5,8,11-14,16H2/t20-,22+,24+/m0/s1; Key:RCYBMSQOSGJZLO-BGWNEDDSSA-N

Levophenacylmorphan is a morphinan derivative that acts as an opioid agonist. It has potent analgesic effects and is around 10x more potent than morphine. Adverse effects associated with its use are those of the opioids as a whole, including pruritus, nausea, respiratory depression, euphoria and development of tolerance and dependence to its effects.

== See also ==
- 3-Hydroxymorphinan
- Levorphanol
- Norlevorphanol
- Phenomorphan
