= C19H27NO4 =

The molecular formula C_{19}H_{27}NO_{4} (molar mass: 333.42 g/mol, exact mass: 333.1940 u) may refer to:

- Drotebanol (Oxymethebanol)
- α-Eucaine, a local anesthetic
- Oreobeiline
- Nolomirole
