= Sinomenine =

Chemical compound

Clinical data
- Other names: Cocculine
- ATC code: none

Identifiers
- IUPAC name: (9α,13α,14α)-4-Hydroxy-3,7-dimethoxy-17-methyl-7,8-didehydromorphinan-6-one
- CAS Number: 115-53-7
- PubChem CID: 5459308
- ChemSpider: 10179905
- UNII: 63LT81K70N
- ChEMBL: ChEMBL248095
- CompTox Dashboard (EPA): DTXSID00871595
- ECHA InfoCard: 100.003.722

Chemical and physical data
- Formula: C_{19}H_{23}NO_{4}
- Molar mass: 329.396 g·mol^{−1}
- 3D model (JSmol): Interactive image
- SMILES: CN1CC[C@@]23CC(=O)C(=C[C@@H]2[C@@H]1CC4=C3C(=C(C=C4)OC)O)OC
- InChI: InChI=1S/C19H23NO4/c1-20-7-6-19-10-14(21)16(24-3)9-12(19)13(20)8-11-4-5-15(23-2)18(22)17(11)19/h4-5,9,12-13,22H,6-8,10H2,1-3H3/t12-,13+,19-/m1/s1; Key:INYYVPJSBIVGPH-QHRIQVFBSA-N

Sinomenine or cocculine is an alkaloid found in the root of the climbing plant Sinomenium acutum which is native to Japan and China. The plant is traditionally used in herbal medicine in these countries for rheumatism and arthritis. However, analgesic action against other types of pain seems to be limited. Sinomenine is a morphinan derivative that is related to the common cough suppressant dextromethorphan. The drug's anti-rheumatic effects are thought to be primarily mediated via release of histamine, but other effects such as inhibition of prostaglandin, leukotriene and nitric oxide synthesis may also be involved.

== See also ==
- Hasubanan
- Oreobeiline
