= Dinalbuphine sebacate =

Opioid analgesic chemical compound

Clinical data
- Other names: DNS; Nalbuphine sebacate; Sebacoyldinalbuphine; SDN; Sebacoyl dinalbuphine ester; SDE; LT-1001
- Routes of administration: Intramuscular injection
- Drug class: μ-Opioid receptor agonist–antagonist; κ-Opioid receptor agonist; Opioid analgesic; Hallucinogen

Pharmacokinetic data
- Bioavailability: • IM: 85.4% (relative to nalbuphine)
- Metabolism: Hydrolysis
- Metabolites: Nalbuphine
- Elimination half-life: • DNS: 83.2 hours (mean absorption time: 145.2 hours) • Nalbuphine: 4.0 hours

Identifiers
- IUPAC name: Bis[(4R,4aS,7S,7aR,12bS)-3-(cyclobutylmethyl)-4a,7-dihydroxy-1,2,4,5,6,7,7a,13-octahydro-4,12-methanobenzofuro[3,2-e]isoquinoline-9-yl] decanedioate
- CAS Number: 311768-81-7
- PubChem CID: 9962795
- ChemSpider: 8138394
- UNII: 464OXX39Y6
- ChEMBL: ChEMBL1823241
- CompTox Dashboard (EPA): DTXSID601336353

Chemical and physical data
- Formula: C_{52}H_{68}N_{2}O_{10}
- Molar mass: 881.120 g·mol^{−1}
- 3D model (JSmol): Interactive image
- SMILES: C1CC(C1)CN2CC[C@]34[C@@H]5[C@H](CC[C@]3([C@H]2CC6=C4C(=C(C=C6)OC(=O)CCCCCCCCC(=O)OC7=C8C9=C(C[C@@H]1[C@]2([C@]9(CCN1CC1CCC1)[C@@H](O8)[C@H](CC2)O)O)C=C7)O5)O)O
- InChI: InChI=1S/C52H68N2O10/c55-35-19-21-51(59)39-27-33-15-17-37(45-43(33)49(51,47(35)63-45)23-25-53(39)29-31-9-7-10-31)61-41(57)13-5-3-1-2-4-6-14-42(58)62-38-18-16-34-28-40-52(60)22-20-36(56)48-50(52,44(34)46(38)64-48)24-26-54(40)30-32-11-8-12-32/h15-18,31-32,35-36,39-40,47-48,55-56,59-60H,1-14,19-30H2/t35-,36-,39+,40+,47-,48-,49-,50-,51+,52+/m0/s1; Key:ALOIOAGKUOQNID-ITCIXCFHSA-N

Dinalbuphine sebacate (DNS), also known as nalbuphine sebacate or as sebacoyl dinalbuphine ester (SDE) and sold under the brand name Naldebain, is a non-controlled opioid analgesic which is used as a 7-day long-acting injection in the treatment of moderate to severe postoperative pain.

The compound is a diester of nalbuphine (Nubain) joined via a sebacic acid linker, and acts as a long-lasting prodrug of nalbuphine via slow hydrolysis. It was developed to extend the duration of action of nalbuphine, which has a short duration and requires frequent injections. Whereas nalbuphine must be injected every 4 to 6 hours, a single injection of DNS lasts for up to 7 to 10 days.

It was invented by Professor Oliver Yoa-Pu Hu (National Defense Medical Center) and codeveloped with Lumosa Therapeutics. Naldebain received market approvals from Taiwan FDA in March 2017, Health Sciences Authority of Singapore in December 2020, the Ministry of Public Health of Thailand in December 2021, the Drug Control Authority of Malaysia in 2022, State Service of Ukraine on Medicines and Drugs Control and Brunei Darussalam Medicines Control Authority (BDMCA) in 2023. Development is ongoing in the United States, China, Korea, and the Philippines.

== Medical uses ==
Naldebain is indicated for the relief of moderate to severe acute postsurgical pain, administered intramuscularly. The product is available in single-use vials; 2 mL single use vial (75 mg/mL) for IM injection is packaged in a carton.

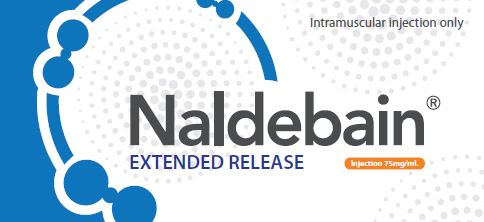
Pack shot of Naldebain

== Pharmacology ==
=== Pharmacodynamics ===
Nalbuphine, and hence DNS, acts as a mixed agonist/antagonist opioid modulator, or more specifically as a moderate-efficacy partial agonist or antagonist of the μ-opioid receptor and as a high-efficacy partial agonist of the κ-opioid receptor.

=== Pharmacokinetics ===
The release mechanism of dinalbuphine sebacate (DNS) upon IM injection is as follows:

1. Upon intramuscular injection, Naldebain first forms an oil depot in the muscle
2. The oil depot gradually disperses as small droplets in the surrounding tissues
3. The prodrug dinalbuphine sebacate gradually diffuses out from the droplets, after which it gets hydrolyzed to the active ingredient nalbuphine via two different mechanisms:
  - a small portion of the prodrug gets hydrolyzed by esterases to release the active ingredient, nalbuphine, in the surrounding tissue cells
  - the majority of the prodrug enters the bloodstream through local tissue lymph drainage and gets hydrolyzed to nalbuphine in the blood

== See also ==
- κ-Opioid receptor agonist
