= Levomethorphan =

Opioid analgesic

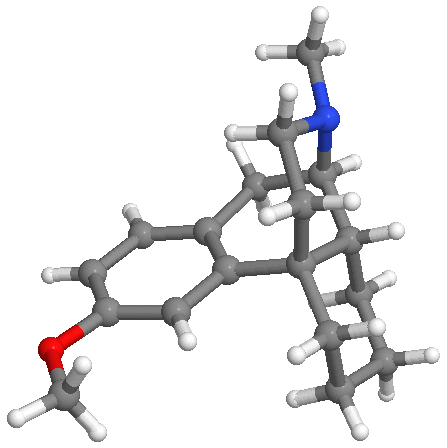

Clinical data
- Dependence liability: High
- Addiction liability: High
- ATC code: None

Legal status
- Legal status: AU: S9 (Prohibited substance); BR: Class A1 (Narcotic drugs); CA: Schedule I; DE: Anlage I (Authorized scientific use only); UK: Class A; US: Schedule II

Pharmacokinetic data
- Elimination half-life: 3-6 hours

Identifiers
- IUPAC name: (1R,9R,10R)-4-methoxy-17-methyl-17-azatetracyclo[7.5.3.0^{1},^{10}.0^{2},^{7}]heptadeca-2(7),3,5-triene
- CAS Number: 125-70-2
- PubChem CID: 5362449
- ChemSpider: 4642423
- UNII: 7ZZ22K9QE6
- KEGG: D12696
- ChEBI: CHEBI:146176
- ChEMBL: ChEMBL1908323
- CompTox Dashboard (EPA): DTXSID20872403
- ECHA InfoCard: 100.004.320

Chemical and physical data
- Formula: C_{18}H_{25}NO
- Molar mass: 271.404 g·mol^{−1}
- 3D model (JSmol): Interactive image
- SMILES: COc1ccc2C[C@@H]3[C@@H]4CCCC[C@]4(CCN3C)c2c1
- InChI: InChI=1S/C18H25NO/c1-19-10-9-18-8-4-3-5-15(18)17(19)11-13-6-7-14(20-2)12-16(13)18/h6-7,12,15,17H,3-5,8-11H2,1-2H3/t15-,17+,18+/m0/s1; Key:MKXZASYAUGDDCJ-CGTJXYLNSA-N

Levomethorphan (LVM) (INN, BAN) is an opioid analgesic of the morphinan family that has never been marketed. It is the L-stereoisomer of racemethorphan (methorphan). The effects of the two isomers of racemethorphan are quite different, with dextromethorphan (DXM) being an antitussive at low doses, but a dissociative at much higher doses. Levomethorphan is about five times stronger than morphine.

Levomethorphan is a prodrug to levorphanol, analogously to DXM acting as a prodrug to dextrorphan, or codeine behaving as a prodrug to morphine. As such, levomethorphan has similar effects to levorphanol but is less potent as it must be demethylated to the active form by liver enzymes before being able to produce its effects. As a prodrug of levorphanol, levomethorphan functions as a potent agonist of all three of the opioid receptors, μ, κ (κ_{1} and κ_{3} but notably not κ_{2}), and δ, as an NMDA receptor antagonist, and as a serotonin-norepinephrine reuptake inhibitor. Via activation of the κ-opioid receptor, levomethorphan can produce dysphoria and psychotomimetic effects such as dissociation and hallucinations.

Levomethorphan is listed under the Single Convention on Narcotic Drugs 1961 and is regulated like morphine in most countries. In the United States it is a Schedule II Narcotic controlled substance with a DEA ACSCN of 9210 and a 2014 annual aggregate manufacturing quota of 195 grams, up from 6 grams the year before. The salts in use are the tartrate (free base conversion ratio 0.644) and hydrobromide (0.958). As of February 2026, no levomethorphan pharmaceuticals are marketed in the United States.

== See also ==
- Butorphanol
- Cyclorphan
- Levallorphan
- Levorphanol
- Nalbuphine
- Oxilorphan
- Proxorphan
- Racemorphan
- Xorphanol
