= Cyclorphan =

Opioid analgesic

Identifiers
- IUPAC name: (−)-3-Hydroxy-N-cyclopropylmethylmorphinan
- CAS Number: 4163-15-9
- PubChem CID: 5359966
- ChemSpider: 4514407
- UNII: U6Z73N36V0
- ChEMBL: ChEMBL49269
- CompTox Dashboard (EPA): DTXSID50878519
- ECHA InfoCard: 100.021.825

Chemical and physical data
- Formula: C_{20}H_{27}NO
- Molar mass: 297.442 g·mol^{−1}
- 3D model (JSmol): Interactive image
- Density: 1.19 g/cm^{3}
- Melting point: 188 °C (370 °F)
- Boiling point: 458.4 °C (857.1 °F)
- SMILES: Oc1ccc4c(c1)[C@@]25[C@H]([C@H](N(CC2)CC3CC3)C4)CCCC5

Cyclorphan is an opioid analgesic of the morphinan family that was never marketed. It acts as a μ-opioid receptor (MOR) weak partial agonist or antagonist, κ-opioid receptor (KOR) full agonist, and, to a much lesser extent, δ-opioid receptor (DOR) agonist (75-fold lower affinity relative to the KOR). The drug was first synthesized in 1964 by scientists at Research Corporation. In clinical trials, it had relatively long duration, good absorption, and provided strong pain relief but produced psychotomimetic effects via KOR activation, so its development was not continued.

== See also ==
- Butorphanol
- Levomethorphan
- Levorphanol
- Nalbuphine
- Oxilorphan
- Proxorphan
- Xorphanol
