= C21H27NO5 =

The molecular formula C_{21}H_{27}NO_{5} (molar mass: 373.44 g/mol, exact mass: 373.1889 u) may refer to:

- Hasubanonine
- Spirotetramat
