= 6-Methylenedihydrodesoxymorphine =

Chemical compound

Clinical data
- Other names: 6-MDDM, 6-Methylene- dihydrodesoxymorphine

Identifiers
- IUPAC name: 4,5-α-Epoxy-17-methyl-6-methylenemorphinan-3-ol
- CAS Number: 3414-84-4
- PubChem CID: 5492874
- ChemSpider: 4591200
- CompTox Dashboard (EPA): DTXSID20187741

Chemical and physical data
- Formula: C_{18}H_{21}NO_{2}
- Molar mass: 283.371 g·mol^{−1}
- 3D model (JSmol): Interactive image
- SMILES: Oc2c1O[C@H]5\C(=C)CC[C@H]4[C@@H]3N(CC[C@@]45c1c(cc2)C3)C
- InChI: InChI=1S/C18H21NO2/c1-10-3-5-12-13-9-11-4-6-14(20)16-15(11)18(12,17(10)21-16)7-8-19(13)2/h4,6,12-13,17,20H,1,3,5,7-9H2,2H3/t12-,13+,17-,18-/m0/s1; Key:LBCZKDPFDXFDTN-GGNLRSJOSA-N

6-Methylenedihydrodesoxymorphine (6-MDDM) is an opiate analogue structurally related to desomorphine that is a derivative of hydromorphone, where the 6-ketone group has been replaced by a methylene group. It has sedative and analgesic effects.

6-Methylenedihydrodesoxymorphine is a potent μ-opioid agonist, 80x stronger than morphine. Compared to morphine it has a faster onset of action and similar duration of effects. It produces around the same degree of respiratory depression as morphine, but less inhibition of gastrointestinal motility. Animal studies show it to be a potent analgesic which produces significant analgesic effects even at low doses while inducing comparatively few side effects, however it has never been developed for medical use in humans. Its synthesis typically takes 12 hours to a day.

6-Methylenedihydrodesoxymorphine is synthesised in two steps; first a Wittig reaction is used, reacting hydrocodone with methylenetriphenylphosphorane and an alkyl lithium reagent in diethyl ether to form 6-methylenedihydrodesoxycodeine. The 3-methoxy group is then cleaved to hydroxy, by reaction with pyridine. The second step tends to be incomplete and often gives fairly low yields, but these can be improved by changing the reaction conditions.

== See also ==
- Desomorphine
- Methyldesorphine
- Nalmefene
- Xorphanol
