= Norlevorphanol =

Chemical compound

Clinical data
- Pregnancy category: ?
- Routes of administration: ?
- ATC code: none

Legal status
- Legal status: BR: Class A1 (Narcotic drugs); CA: Schedule I; DE: Anlage I (Authorized scientific use only)

Identifiers
- IUPAC name: (–)-morphinan-3-ol
- CAS Number: 1531-12-0
- PubChem CID: 519103
- ChemSpider: 16735936
- UNII: IL94262N7K
- KEGG: D12692
- CompTox Dashboard (EPA): DTXSID701018239
- ECHA InfoCard: 100.014.761

Chemical and physical data
- Formula: C_{16}H_{21}NO
- Molar mass: 243.350 g·mol^{−1}

Norlevorphanol is an opioid analgesic of the morphinan family that was never marketed. It is the levo-isomer of 3-hydroxymorphinan (morphinan-3-ol). Norlevorphanol is a Schedule I Narcotic controlled substance in the United States with an ACSCN of 9634 and in 2014 it had an annual aggregate manufacturing quota of 52 grams. It is used as the hydrobromide (free base conversion ratio 0.750) and hydrochloride (0.870). It has morphine-like pharmacological properties.

== See also ==
- Levallorphan
- Levorphanol
- Levomethorphan
