= Nalorphine dinicotinate =

Chemical compound

Clinical data
- ATC code: None

Legal status
- Legal status: In general: ℞ (Prescription only)

Identifiers
- IUPAC name: (5α,6α)-17-allyl-7,8-didehydro-4,5-epoxymorphinan-3,6-diyl dinicotinate
- CAS Number: 3194-25-0
- PubChem CID: 3083791
- ChemSpider: 2340945
- CompTox Dashboard (EPA): DTXSID30953838

Chemical and physical data
- Formula: C_{31}H_{27}N_{3}O_{5}
- Molar mass: 521.573 g·mol^{−1}
- 3D model (JSmol): Interactive image
- SMILES: O=C(O[C@H]2\C=C/[C@H]6[C@@H]5N(CC[C@@]61c4c(O[C@H]12)c(OC(=O)c3cccnc3)ccc4C5)C\C=C)c7cccnc7
- InChI: InChI=1S/C31H27N3O5/c1-2-14-34-15-11-31-22-8-10-25(38-30(36)21-6-4-13-33-18-21)28(31)39-27-24(9-7-19(26(27)31)16-23(22)34)37-29(35)20-5-3-12-32-17-20/h2-10,12-13,17-18,22-23,25,28H,1,11,14-16H2/t22-,23+,25-,28-,31-/m0/s1; Key:BFYWWTIGNJJAHF-LTQSXOHQSA-N

Nalorphine dinicotinate (trade name Nimelan), also known as N-allylnormorphine dinicotinate, dinicotinoylnalorphine, or niconalorphine, is a semisynthetic, mixed opioid agonist-antagonist which is described as a narcotic antagonist but may produce limited analgesia and sedation at higher doses in opioid naive patients (with limited euphoria and dependence liability). It is the 3,6-dinicotinate ester of nalorphine, and is therefore the nalorphine analogue of nicomorphine (which is the 3,6-dinicotinate ester of morphine).

As nalorphine dinicotinate is only regulated at the Rx (prescription required) drug, it would be legal to possess with a valid prescription should a patient manage to acquire it.

== See also ==
- Diacetylnalorphine
