= Diacetylnalorphine =

Names
- IUPAC name 17-(Prop-2-en-1-yl)-7,8-didehydro-4,5α-epoxymorphinan-3,6α-diyl diacetate
- Systematic IUPAC name (4R,4aR,7S,7aR,12bS)-3-(Prop-2-en-1-yl)-2,3,4,4a,7,7a-hexahydro-1H-4,12-methano[1]benzofuro[3,2-e]isoquinoline-7,9-diyl diacetate
- Other names O3,O6-Diacetyl-N-allyl-normorphine

Identifiers
CAS Number	2748-74-5
3D model (JSmol)	Interactive image
ChEMBL	ChEMBL2106214
ChemSpider	16736941
PubChem CID	20055473
UNII	Q083G8ZAJH
CompTox Dashboard (EPA)	DTXSID401043407
- InChI: InChI=1S/C23H25NO5/c1-4-10-24-11-9-23-16-6-8-19(28-14(3)26)22(23)29-21-18(27-13(2)25)7-5-15(20(21)23)12-17(16)24/h4-8,16-17,19,22H,1,9-12H2,2-3H3/t16-,17+,19-,22-,23-/m0/s1 Key: PRQBBJWORXAHMN-JIAAILLZSA-N
- SMILES: CC(=O)O[C@H]1C=C[C@H]2[C@H]3CC4=C5[C@]2([C@H]1OC5=C(C=C4)OC(=O)C)CCN3CC=C

Properties
Chemical formula	C_{23}H_{25}NO_{5}
Molar mass	395.4 g/mol
- Except where otherwise noted, data are given for materials in their standard state (at 25 °C [77 °F], 100 kPa). Infobox references

Diacetylnalorphine (BAN), also known as O3,O6-diacetyl-N-allyl-normorphine, is an opioid drug described as an analgesic and antidote which was never marketed. It is the 3,6-diacetyl ester of nalorphine, and therefore the heroin analogue of nalorphine. Diacetylnalorphine may behave as a prodrug to nalorphine, similarly to the cases of heroin (diacetylmorphine) to morphine and diacetyldihydromorphine to dihydromorphine.

== See also ==
- Nalorphine dinicotinate
