= Oreobeiline =

Names
- IUPAC name (6α,7β,9α,13α)-3,6-Dimethoxy-17-methylmorphinan-2,7-diol

Identifiers
CAS Number	97400-76-5
3D model (JSmol)	Interactive image
PubChem CID	607379
- InChI: InChI=1S/C19H27NO4/c1-20-5-4-19-10-18(24-3)16(22)8-13(19)14(20)6-11-7-15(21)17(23-2)9-12(11)19/h7,9,13-14,16,18,21-22H,4-6,8,10H2,1-3H3 Key: CARXYYOGTFJDBP-UHFFFAOYSA-N
- SMILES: CN1CCC23CC(C(CC2C1CC4=CC(=C(C=C34)OC)O)O)OC

Properties
Chemical formula	C_{19}H_{27}NO_{4}
Molar mass	333.428 g·mol^{−1}
- Except where otherwise noted, data are given for materials in their standard state (at 25 °C [77 °F], 100 kPa). Infobox references

Oreobeiline is an morphinan alkaloid of Beilschmiedia with anti-acetylcholinesterase, anti-alpha-glucosidase, anti-leishmanial, and anti-fungal activities.

== See also ==
- Sinomenine
