= Ceiling effect (pharmacology) =

In pharmacology, the term ceiling effect refers to the property of increasing doses of a given medication to have progressively smaller incremental effects (an example of diminishing returns). Mixed agonist-antagonist opioids, such as nalbuphine, serve as a classic example of the ceiling effect; increasing the dose of a narcotic frequently leads to smaller and smaller gains in relief of pain. In many cases, the severity of side effects from a medication increases as the dose increases, long after its therapeutic ceiling has been reached.

The term is defined as "the phenomenon in which a drug reaches a maximum effect, so that increasing the drug dosage does not increase its effectiveness." Sometimes drugs cannot be compared across a wide range of treatment situations because one drug has a ceiling effect.

Sometimes the desired effect increases with dose, but side effects worsen or start being dangerous, and risk to benefit ratio increases. This is because of occupation of all the receptors in a given specimen.

== See also ==
- Agonist–antagonist opioids
- Buprenorphine
- Codeine
- Dose–response relationship
- Pain ladder
- Weber–Fechner law
