= 2-OH-NPA =

Chemical compound

Identifiers
- IUPAC name: (R)-2,10,11-Trihydroxy-N-propylnoraporphine
- CAS Number: 79640-85-0
- PubChem CID: 6603798
- ChemSpider: 8244599
- UNII: A88V5R3JGJ
- CompTox Dashboard (EPA): DTXSID00435151 DTXSID50274451, DTXSID00435151

Chemical and physical data
- Formula: C_{19}H_{21}NO_{3}
- Molar mass: 311.381 g·mol^{−1}
- 3D model (JSmol): Interactive image
- SMILES: c4c3c2c(cc4O)-c1c(ccc(O)c1O)CC2N(CC3)CCC
- InChI: InChI=1S/C19H21NO3.BrH/c1-2-6-20-7-5-12-8-13(21)10-14-17(12)15(20)9-11-3-4-16(22)19(23)18(11)14;/h3-4,8,10,15,21-23H,2,5-7,9H2,1H3;1H/t15-;/m1./s1; Key:KIAIFHTWTMKEDI-XFULWGLBSA-N

2-OH-NPA is a drug used in scientific research which acts as a potent and selective agonist for the dopamine D_{2} receptor.
