= Hasubanonine =

Names
- Systematic IUPAC name 3,4,7,8-Tetramethoxy-17-methyl-7,8-didehydrohasubanan-6-one
- Other names Hasubanonine

Identifiers
CAS Number	1805-85-2
3D model (JSmol)	Interactive image
ChemSpider	390731
PubChem CID	442246
UNII	9TLC4WA6XC
CompTox Dashboard (EPA)	DTXSID50170969
- InChI: InChI=1S/C21H27NO5/c1-22-11-10-20-12-14(23)17(25-3)19(27-5)21(20,22)9-8-13-6-7-15(24-2)18(26-4)16(13)20/h6-7H,8-12H2,1-5H3/t20-,21+/m0/s1 Key: DXUSNRCTWFHYFS-LEWJYISDSA-N; InChI=1/C21H27NO5/c1-22-11-10-20-12-14(23)17(25-3)19(27-5)21(20,22)9-8-13-6-7-15(24-2)18(26-4)16(13)20/h6-7H,8-12H2,1-5H3/t20-,21+/m0/s1 Key: DXUSNRCTWFHYFS-LEWJYISDBB
- SMILES: O=C4C(\OC)=C(\OC)[C@]23N(CC[C@@]3(c1c(ccc(OC)c1OC)CC2)C4)C

Properties
Chemical formula	C_{21}H_{27}NO_{5}
Molar mass	373.449 g·mol^{−1}
- Except where otherwise noted, data are given for materials in their standard state (at 25 °C [77 °F], 100 kPa). verify (what is ?) Infobox references

Hasubanonine is a member of the hasubanan family of alkaloids. The alkaloid with an isoquinoline substructure has the molecular formula of C_{21}H_{27}NO_{5}. The enantiomer of the natural product is being studied as a potential painkiller. Hasubanonine is structurally related to the morphinan class of opioid analgesics.

The enantioselective total synthesis of (–)-hasubanonine and related natural products, (−)-runanine, (−)-delavayine, and (+)-periglaucine B were first achieved by Prof. Seth Herzon and co-workers at Yale University in 2011.
