= Triethyl phosphonoacetate =

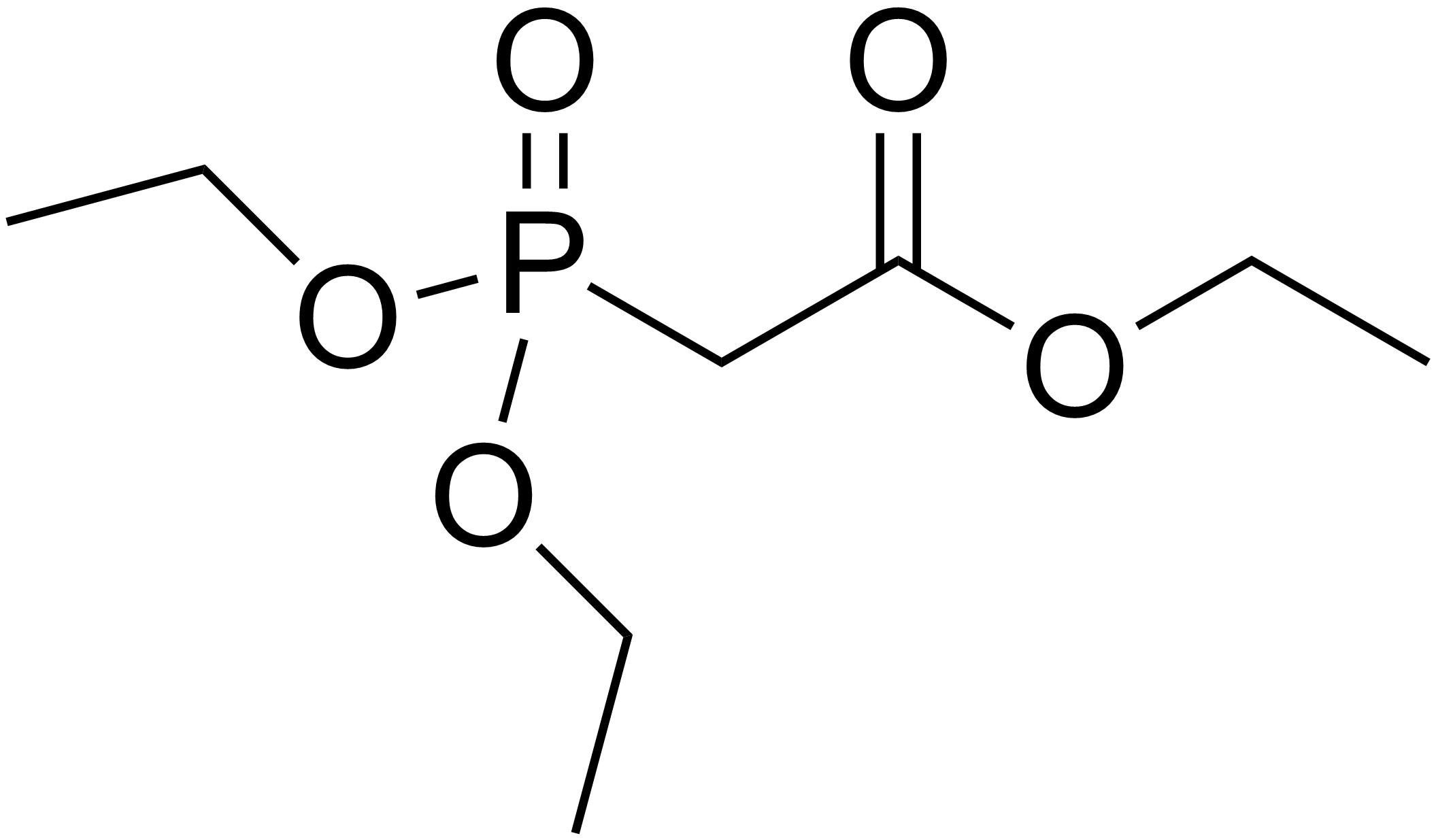

Names
- Preferred IUPAC name Ethyl (diethoxyphosphoryl)acetate

Identifiers
CAS Number	867-13-0
3D model (JSmol)	Interactive image
ChemSpider	12776
ECHA InfoCard	100.011.598
PubChem CID	13345
UNII	022826171T
CompTox Dashboard (EPA)	DTXSID4041573
- InChI: InChI=1S/C8H17O5P/c1-4-11-8(9)7-14(10,12-5-2)13-6-3/h4-7H2,1-3H3 Key: GGUBFICZYGKNTD-UHFFFAOYSA-N; InChI=1/C8H17O5P/c1-4-11-8(9)7-14(10,12-5-2)13-6-3/h4-7H2,1-3H3 Key: GGUBFICZYGKNTD-UHFFFAOYAB
- SMILES: CCOC(=O)CP(=O)(OCC)OCC

Properties
Chemical formula	C_{8}H_{17}O_{5}P
Molar mass	224.19 g/mol
Boiling point	142 to 145 °C (288 to 293 °F; 415 to 418 K) at 9 mmHg
- Except where otherwise noted, data are given for materials in their standard state (at 25 °C [77 °F], 100 kPa). verify (what is ?) Infobox references

Triethyl phosphonoacetate is a reagent for organic synthesis used in the Horner-Wadsworth-Emmons reaction (HWE) or the Horner-Emmons modification.

Triethyl phosphonoacetate can be added dropwise to sodium methoxide solution to prepare a phosphonate anion. It has an acidic proton that can easily be abstracted by a weak base. When used in an HWE reaction with a carbonyl the resulting alkene formed is usually the E alkene, and is generated with excellent regioselectivity.
