= Nalorphine =

Chemical compound

Clinical data
- Trade names: Lethidrone, Nalline
- Other names: N-Allylnormorphine
- AHFS/Drugs.com: International Drug Names
- Drug class: μ-Opioid receptor agonist–antagonist; κ-Opioid receptor agonist; Opioid antagonist; Antidote; Hallucinogen
- ATC code: V03AB02 (WHO)

Legal status
- Legal status: AU: S4 (Prescription only); BR: Class A2 (Narcotic drugs); CA: Schedule I; US: Schedule III

Identifiers
- IUPAC name: 17-allyl-7,8-didehydro-4,5α-epoxymorphinan-3,6α-diol
- CAS Number: 62-67-9
- PubChem CID: 5284595
- IUPHAR/BPS: 1629
- DrugBank: DB11490
- ChemSpider: 4447643
- UNII: U59WB2WRY2
- KEGG: D08247
- ChEBI: CHEBI:7458
- ChEMBL: ChEMBL415284
- CompTox Dashboard (EPA): DTXSID3023348
- ECHA InfoCard: 100.000.497

Chemical and physical data
- Formula: C_{19}H_{21}NO_{3}
- Molar mass: 311.381 g·mol^{−1}
- 3D model (JSmol): Interactive image
- SMILES: O[C@@H]1[C@@H]2OC3=C4C(C[C@H]5N(CC[C@]42[C@@]5([H])C=C1)CC=C)=CC=C3O
- InChI: InChI=1S/C19H21NO3/c1-2-8-20-9-7-19-12-4-6-15(22)18(19)23-17-14(21)5-3-11(16(17)19)10-13(12)20/h2-6,12-13,15,18,21-22H,1,7-10H2/t12-,13+,15-,18-,19-/m0/s1; Key:UIQMVEYFGZJHCZ-SSTWWWIQSA-N

Nalorphine (INN; also known as N-allylnormorphine; brand names Lethidrone and Nalline) is a mixed opioid agonist–antagonist with opioid antagonist and analgesic properties. It was introduced in 1954 and was used as an antidote to reverse opioid overdose and in a challenge test to determine opioid dependence.

Nalorphine was the second opioid antagonist to be introduced, preceded by nalodeine (N-allylnorcodeine) in 1915 and followed by naloxone in 1960 and naltrexone in 1963. Due to potent activation of the κ-opioid receptor, nalorphine produces side effects such as dysphoria, anxiety, confusion, and hallucinations, and for this reason, is no longer used medically.

== Pharmacology ==
=== Pharmacodynamics ===
Nalorphine acts at two opioid receptors — the μ-opioid receptor (MOR) where it has antagonistic effects, and at the κ-opioid receptor (KOR) (K_{i} = 1.6 nM; EC_{50} = 483 nM; E_{max} = 95%) where it exerts high-efficacy partial agonist/near-full agonist characteristics.

== Chemistry ==
=== Analogues ===
Nalorphine has a number of analogues including niconalorphine (the nicomorphine analogue), diacetylnalorphine (heroin analogue), dihydronalorphine (dihydromorphine), and a number of others as well as a number of codeine-based analogues.

=== Synthesis ===
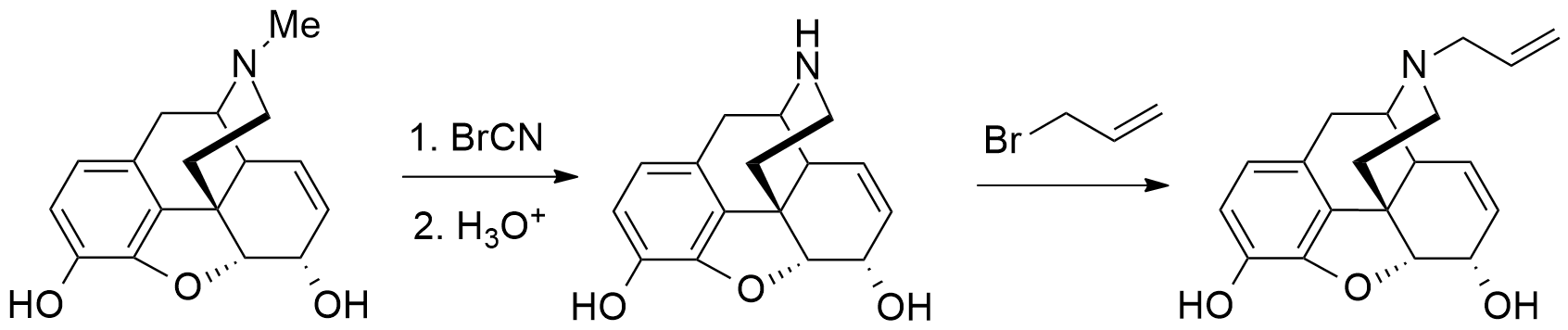
Nalorphine synthesis: amended procedure:

More recently, it has become much more commonplace to use ethyl chloroformate instead of cyanogen bromide for the Von Braun degradation demethylation step. See for example the list of phenyltropanes or the synthesis of paroxetine for further examples of this.

== See also ==
- Opioid antagonist
- κ-Opioid receptor agonist
- Diacetylnalorphine
- Levallorphan
- Nalbuphine
- Nalorphine dinicotinate
