= 3-Hydroxymorphinan =

Chemical compound

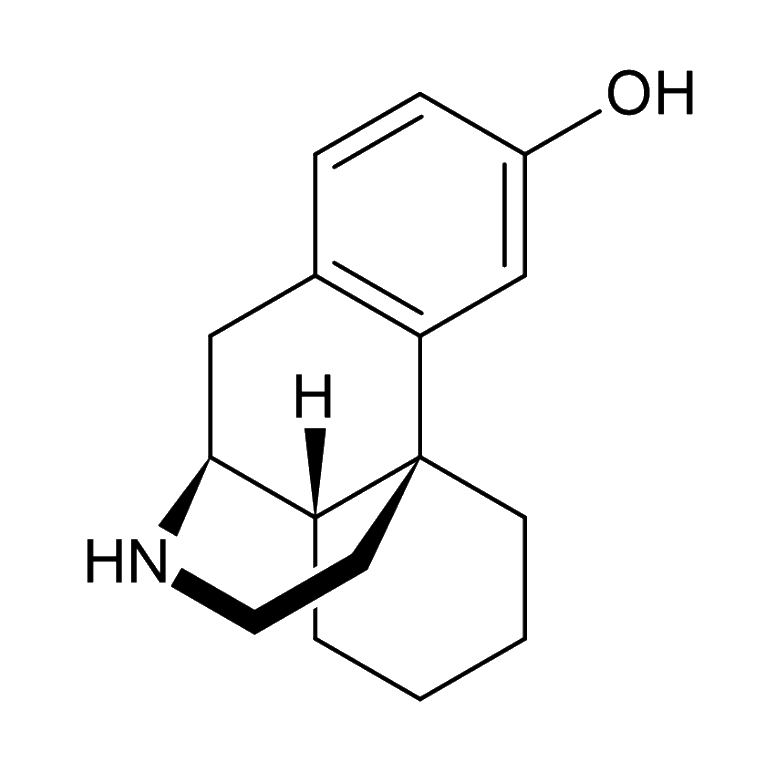

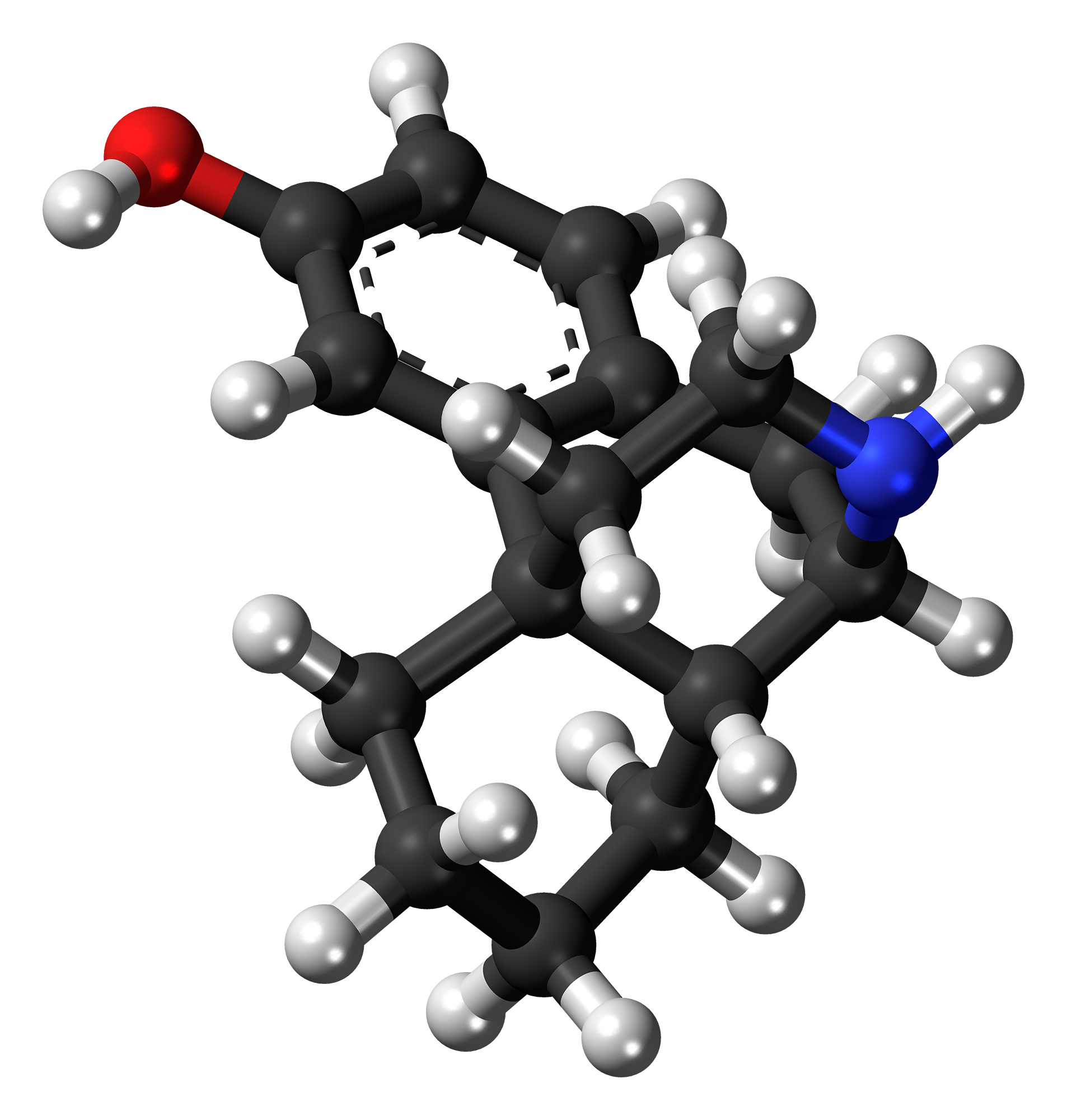

Clinical data
- ATC code: None

Pharmacokinetic data
- Bioavailability: 18%

Identifiers
- IUPAC name: (±)-morphinan-3-ol
- CAS Number: 39131-41-4
- ChemSpider: 16735936
- UNII: E4S6LA88PG

Chemical and physical data
- Formula: C_{16}H_{21}NO
- Molar mass: 243.350 g·mol^{−1}
- 3D model (JSmol): Interactive image
- SMILES: Oc3ccc4C[C@H]1NCC[C@@]2(CCCC[C@@H]12)c4c3
- InChI: InChI=1S/C16H21NO/c18-12-5-4-11-9-15-13-3-1-2-6-16(13,7-8-17-15)14(11)10-12/h4-5,10,13,15,17-18H,1-3,6-9H2/t13-,15+,16+/m0/s1; Key:IYNWSQDZXMGGGI-NUEKZKHPSA-N

3-Hydroxymorphinan (3-HM), or morphinan-3-ol, is a psychoactive drug of the morphinan family. It is the racemic counterpart to norlevorphanol.

The dextrorotatory stereoisomer of the compound is an active metabolite of dextromethorphan, dextrorphan, and 3-methoxymorphinan, and similarly to them has potent neuroprotective and neurotrophic effects on LTS- and MPTP-treated dopaminergic neurons of the nigrostriatal pathway, but notably without producing any neuropsychotoxic side effects (e.g., dissociation or hallucinations) or having any anticonvulsant actions. It does not seem to bind to the NMDA receptor, and instead, its neuroprotective properties appear result from inhibition of glutamate release via the suppression of presynaptic voltage-dependent Ca^{2+} entry and protein kinase C activity. In any case, as such, the compound has been investigated as a potential management of Parkinson's disease medication (antiparkinsonian agent). A prodrug, GCC1290K, has been developed on account of 3-HM's poor bioavailability (18%), and a New Drug Application has been approved for it by the United States Food and Drug Administration. It is currently undergoing clinical trials for the treatment of Parkinson's disease. It does not have a Controlled Substances Act 1970 schedule, ACSCN, or annual aggregate manufacturing quota and may not necessarily be controlled, whilst norlevorphanol is; none of the dextrorotary derivatives of the dromoran and norlevorphanol sub-families of morphinan derivatives are controlled as they do not have opioid activity but the other racemic compounds are.

3-HM's levorotatory stereoisomer, norlevorphanol, in contrast to (+)-3-HM, is an opioid analgesic. It was never marketed as such however, probably due to a combination of the facts that norlevorphanol has low bioavailability and that its potency is diminished compared to its N-methylated analogue levorphanol.

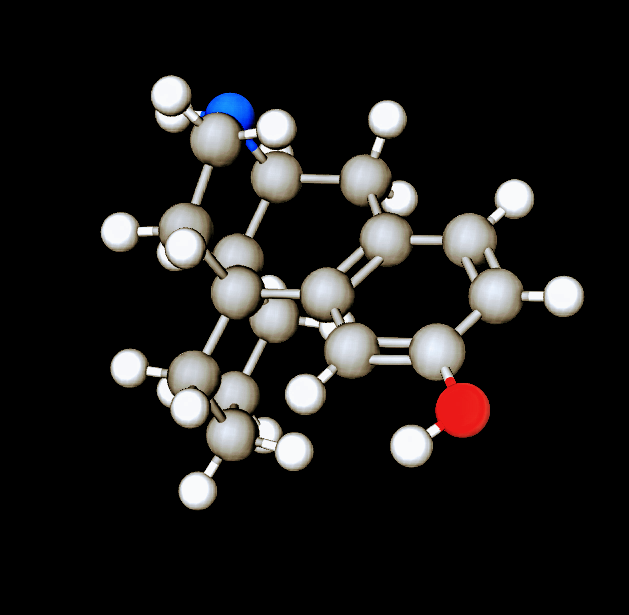
(+)-3-Hydroxymorphinan the Dextro isomer of 3-hydroxymorphinan. The Dextro form is metabolite of 3-methoxymorphinan which is metabolite of Dextromethorphan
