= Hasubanan =

Names
- IUPAC name (3aS-cis)-2,3,4,5-Tetrahydro-3a,9b-butano-1H-benz[e]indole

Identifiers
CAS Number	14510-67-9
3D model (JSmol)	Interactive image
ChEBI	CHEBI:35647
ChemSpider	20152973
PubChem CID	6857499
UNII	8K38RGP7SY
CompTox Dashboard (EPA)	DTXSID60425891
- InChI: InChI=1S/C16H21N/c1-2-6-14-13(5-1)7-10-16-9-4-3-8-15(14,16)11-12-17-16/h1-2,5-6,17H,3-4,7-12H2/t15-,16+/m1/s1 Key: RKWPQIQYRNOTMT-CVEARBPZSA-N; InChI=1/C16H21N/c1-2-6-14-13(5-1)7-10-16-9-4-3-8-15(14,16)11-12-17-16/h1-2,5-6,17H,3-4,7-12H2/t15-,16+/m1/s1 Key: RKWPQIQYRNOTMT-CVEARBPZBP
- SMILES: C2C[C@]14CCCC[C@@]4(CCN1)c3ccccc23

Properties
Chemical formula	C_{16}H_{21}N
Molar mass	227.351 g·mol^{−1}
- Except where otherwise noted, data are given for materials in their standard state (at 25 °C [77 °F], 100 kPa). verify (what is ?) Infobox references

Hasubanan is an alkaloid with the chemical formula of C_{16}H_{21}N. It forms the central core of a class of alkaloids known collectively as hasubanans. The compound is derived from reticuline, as is morphinan, but is comparatively more oxidized and rearranged. It is similar to acutumine.

Various alkaloids of this family have been synthesized in the laboratories.

== See also ==
- Hasubanonine
