= Morphinan =

Parent compound of opioids

- Structural formula of morphinan

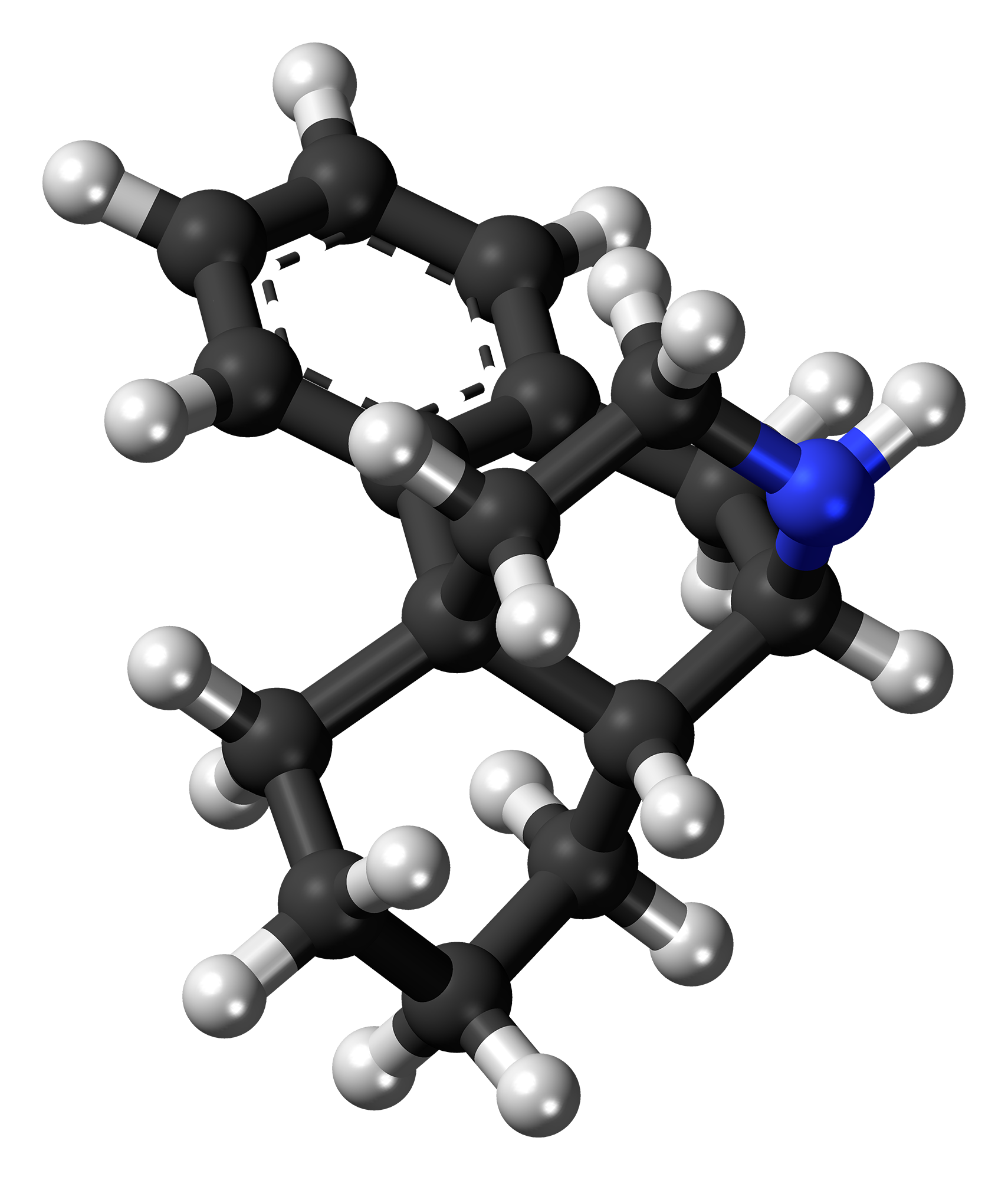
- Ball-and-stick model of morphinan

Names
- IUPAC name Morphinan
- Systematic IUPAC name (4aR,10R,10aR)-1,3,4,9,10,10a-Hexahydro-2H-10,4a-(azanoethano)phenanthrene

Identifiers
CAS Number	468-10-0
3D model (JSmol)	Interactive image
Beilstein Reference	1375527
ChEBI	CHEBI:35649
ChemSpider	5256833
PubChem CID	11947744
UNII	O97T9O1050
CompTox Dashboard (EPA)	DTXSID00425890
- InChI: InChI=1S/C16H21N/c1-2-6-13-12(5-1)11-15-14-7-3-4-8-16(13,14)9-10-17-15/h1-2,5-6,14-15,17H,3-4,7-11H2/t14-,15-,16+/m0/s1 Key: INAXVFBXDYWQFN-HRCADAONSA-N
- SMILES: c12c(cccc1)C[C@H]3NCC[C@]24[C@H]3CCCC4

Properties
Chemical formula	C_{16}H_{21}N
Molar mass	227.351 g·mol^{−1}
Density	1.58 g/cm^{3}
Boiling point	115±0.05 °C (liquid oil)
- Except where otherwise noted, data are given for materials in their standard state (at 25 °C [77 °F], 100 kPa). verify (what is ?) Infobox references

Morphinan is the prototype chemical structure of a large chemical class of psychoactive drugs, consisting of opiate analgesics, cough suppressants, and dissociative hallucinogens, among others. Typical examples include compounds such as morphine, codeine, and dextromethorphan (DXM). Despite related molecular structures, the pharmacological profiles and mechanisms of action between the various types of morphinan substances can vary substantially. They tend to function either as μ-opioid receptor agonists (analgesics), or NMDA receptor antagonists (dissociatives).

== Structure ==
Morphinan has a phenanthrene core structure with the A ring remaining aromatic and the B and C rings being saturated, and an additional nitrogen-containing, six-membered, saturated ring, the D ring, being attached to carbons 9 and 13 of the core, and with the nitrogen being at position 17 of the composite.

Of the major naturally occurring opiates of the morphinan type—morphine, codeine and thebaine—thebaine has no therapeutic properties (it causes seizures in mammals), but it provides a low-cost feedstock for the industrial production of at least four semi-synthetic opiate agonists, including hydrocodone, hydromorphone, oxycodone and oxymorphone, and the opioid antagonist naloxone.

Morphinan is characterized by a common tetracyclic chemical scaffold. As such, the morphinan class includes naturally occurring alkaloids derived from the opium poppy (opiates), as well as a wide range of semi-synthetic drugs including oxycodone and the Bentley compounds, to fully synthetic opioid derivatives with some having thousands of times the potency of morphine. Other examples are found in fentanyl used in general anesthesia, methadone for dependency treatment, as well as lower activity compounds such as codeine and loperamide.

== Structure-activity relationship ==
The physiological behavior of morphinans (naturally occurring and semi-synthetic derivatives) is thought to be associated with the aromatic A ring, the nitrogen-containing D ring and the "bridge" between these two rings formed by carbons 9, 10 and 11 of the core, with the D ring "above" the core (levorotatory).

Small groups are usually found on morphinan derivatives at carbons 3 and 6.

Many such derivatives have an epoxy group between carbons 4 and 5 (i.e., 4,5α-epoxy), thereby forming an E ring.

The substitution of certain bulky groups on nitrogen 17 converts an opioid agonist into an opioid antagonist, the most important of which is naloxone, a non-selective opioid antagonist with no opioid agonist properties whatsoever ("silent" antagonist). Additionally, substitution of certain very bulky groups on carbon 6 converts naloxone into a peripherally-selective opioid antagonist with no centrally-selective antagonist properties (naloxegol).

The addition of a two-carbon bridge between carbons 6 and 14 (e.g., 6,14-ethano, or 6,14-etheno), and which significantly distorts the C ring, may increase potency 1,000 to 10,000 times, or greater, compared to morphine, as in etorphine, and others. The relative potency is thought to be associated with the degree of distortion of the C ring, and is perhaps greatest in diprenorphine, where this group is α,α-dimethyl-6,14-etheno. Diprenorphine (M5050) is the recommended etorphine (M99) antagonist, but it is not a pure opioid antagonist (i.e., it is also a weak opioid agonist), so naloxone remains a significant therapeutic tool in suspected cases of opioid overdose. See also Bentley compounds.

If the D ring is "below" the core (dextrorotatory), the analgesic and euphoric properties are eliminated or are dramatically reduced, but the cough-suppressant property is retained, as in dextromethorphan.

== Chemical derivatives ==
Immediate derivatives of morphinan include:

- 3-Hydroxymorphinan
- 3-Methoxymorphinan
- Butorphanol
- Cyclorphan
- Dextrallorphan
- Dextromethorphan
- Dextrorphan
- Dimemorfan
- Ketorfanol
- Levallorphan
- Levofurethylnormorphanol
- Levomethorphan
- Levophenacylmorphan
- Levorphanol
- Norlevorphanol
- Racemethorphan
- Racemorphan
- Phenomorphan
- Xorphanol

More distant derivatives include:

- Oxilorphan
- Proxorphan
- Cyprodime
- Drotebanol
- Nalbuphine
- Sinomenine

As well as the following:

- Morphine (and naturally occurring and semi-synthetic analogues)

Chemical structure of morphine, (5α,6α)-7,8-Didehydro- 4,5-epoxy-17-methylmorphinan-3,6-diol, perhaps the most important naturally occurring substance of the morphinan type.

- Naloxone

Chemical structure of naloxone, 17-Allyl-4,5α-epoxy-3,14-dihydroxymorphinan-6-one.

- Naloxegol

Chemical structure of naloxegol, (5α,6α)-17-Allyl-6-[(20-hydroxy-3,6,9,12,15,18-hexaoxaicos-1-yl)oxy]-4,5-epoxymorphinan-3,14-diol.

== Chemical relatives ==
The following structures are related to morphinan:

- Benzylisoquinoline
- Hasubanan
- Hasubanonine
