= Butorphanol =

Opioid analgesic

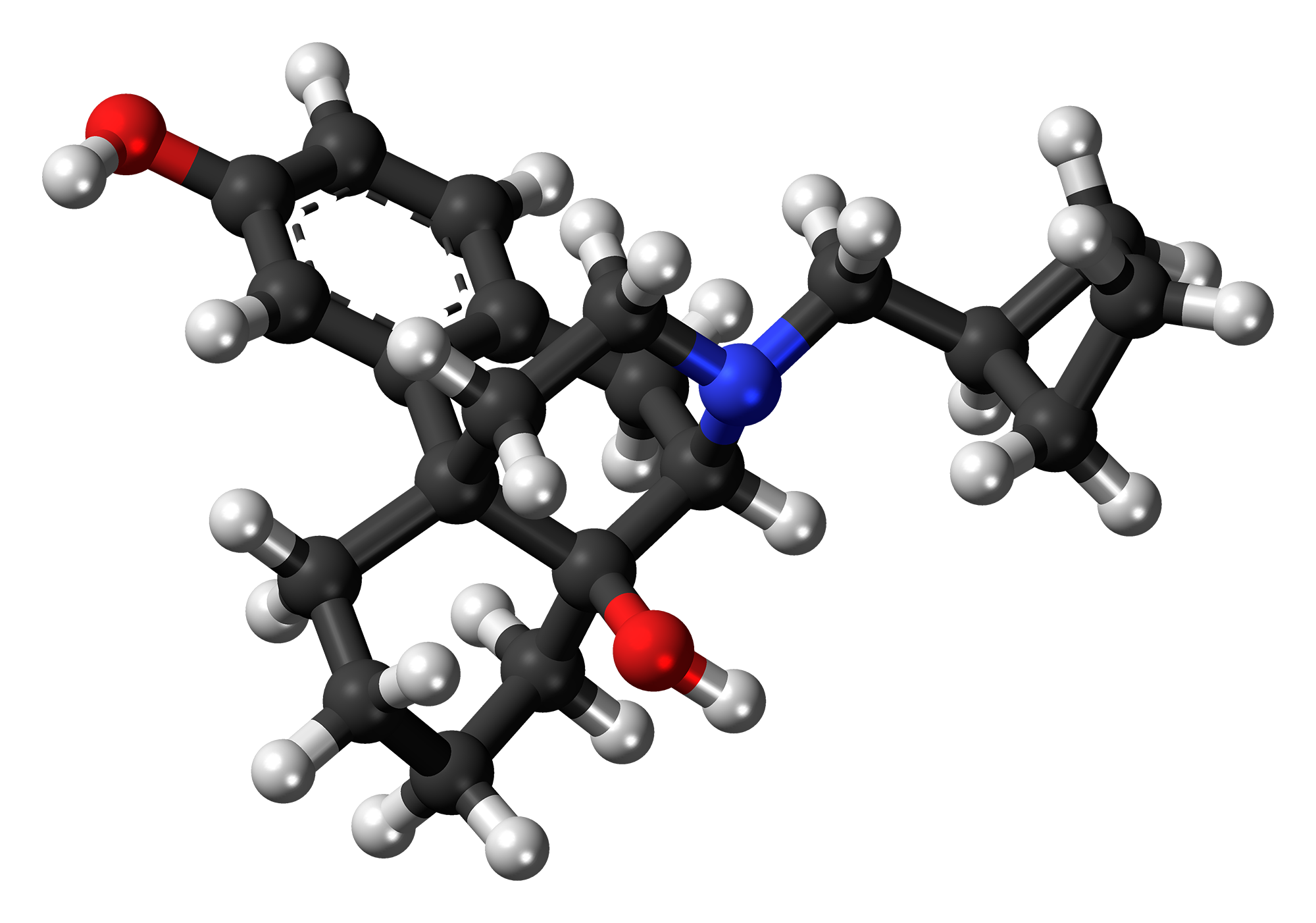

Clinical data
- Trade names: Stadol, others
- Other names: BC 2627
- AHFS/Drugs.com: Micromedex Detailed Consumer Information
- MedlinePlus: a682667
- Pregnancy category: C/D (United States)
- Routes of administration: Oral, sublingual, buccal, intranasal, intravenous
- Drug class: μ-Opioid receptor agonist–antagonist; κ-Opioid receptor agonist; Opioid analgesic; Hallucinogen
- ATC code: N02AF01 (WHO) QR05DA90 (WHO)

Legal status
- Legal status: AU: S8 (Controlled drug); BR: Class A1 (Narcotic drugs); CA: Schedule IV; UK: Controlled Drug; US: Schedule IV

Pharmacokinetic data
- Bioavailability: Intranasal: 60–70% Oral: 10% Sublingual/Buccal: 25–35%
- Metabolism: Liver hydroxylated & glucuronidated
- Elimination half-life: 4–7 hours
- Excretion: Kidney, 75% Biliary, 11-14% Fecal, 15%

Identifiers
- IUPAC name: (4bR, 8aR, 9S)-11-(cyclobutylmethyl)-6,7,8,8a,9,10-hexahydro-5H-9,4b-(epiminoethano) phenanthrene-3,8a-diol
- CAS Number: 42408-82-2
- PubChem CID: 5361092
- IUPHAR/BPS: 7591
- DrugBank: DB00611
- ChemSpider: 16735714
- UNII: QV897JC36D
- KEGG: D00837
- ChEBI: CHEBI:3242
- ChEMBL: ChEMBL33986
- CompTox Dashboard (EPA): DTXSID1022714
- ECHA InfoCard: 100.050.717

Chemical and physical data
- Formula: C_{21}H_{29}NO_{2}
- Molar mass: 327.468 g·mol^{−1}
- 3D model (JSmol): Interactive image
- SMILES: OC1=CC2=C(C=C1)C[C@H]3N(CC[C@@]24CCCC[C@@]34O)CC5CCC5
- InChI: InChI=1S/C21H29NO2/c23-17-7-6-16-12-19-21(24)9-2-1-8-20(21,18(16)13-17)10-11-22(19)14-15-4-3-5-15/h6-7,13,15,19,23-24H,1-5,8-12,14H2/t19-,20+,21-/m1/s1; Key:IFKLAQQSCNILHL-QHAWAJNXSA-N

Butorphanol is a morphinan-type synthetic agonist–antagonist opioid analgesic developed by Bristol-Myers. Butorphanol is most closely structurally related to levorphanol. Butorphanol is available as the tartrate salt in injectable, tablet, and intranasal spray formulations. The tablet form is only used in dogs, cats and horses due to low bioavailability in humans.

It was patented in 1971 and approved for medical use in 1979.

== Medical uses ==
The most common indication for butorphanol is management of migraine using the intranasal spray formulation. It may also be used parenterally for management of moderate-to-severe pain, as a supplement for balanced general anesthesia, and management of pain during labor. Butorphanol is also quite effective at reducing post-operative shivering (owing to its kappa agonist activity). Butorphanol is more effective in reducing pain in women than in men.

== Pharmacology ==
Butorphanol exhibits partial agonist and antagonist activity at the μ-opioid receptor, as well as partial agonist activity at the κ-opioid receptor (K_{i} = 2.5 nM; EC_{50} = 57 nM; E_{max} = 57%). Stimulation of these receptors on central nervous system neurons causes an intracellular inhibition of adenylate cyclase, closing of influx membrane calcium channels, and opening of membrane potassium channels. This leads to hyperpolarization of the cell membrane potential and suppression of action potential transmission of ascending pain pathways. Because of its κ-agonist activity, at analgesic doses butorphanol increases pulmonary arterial pressure and cardiac work. Additionally, κ-agonism can cause dysphoria at therapeutic or supratherapeutic doses; this gives butorphanol a lower potential for abuse than other opioid drugs.

== Society and culture ==
=== Name ===
Within the INN, USAN, BAN, and AAN naming systems this drug is known as butorphanol, while within JAN it is named torbugesic. As the tartrate salt, butorphanol is known as butorphanol tartrate (USAN, BAN).

=== Legal status ===
Butorphanol is listed under the Single Convention on Narcotic Drugs 1961 and in the United States is a Schedule IV controlled substance with a DEA ACSCN of 9720. The free base conversion ratio of the hydrochloride is 0.69. Butorphanol was originally a Schedule II controlled substance and was later decontrolled at one point.

== Veterinary use ==
In veterinary anesthesia, butorphanol (trade name: Torbugesic) is widely used as a sedative and analgesic in dogs, cats and horses. For sedation, it may be combined with tranquilizers such as alpha-2 agonists (medetomidine), benzodiazepines, or acepromazine in dogs, cats and exotic animals. It is frequently combined with xylazine or detomidine in horses. Butorphanol may be administered intravenously, intramuscularly, subcutaneously, or per os. Intramuscular and subcutaneous administration may cause pain. Oral tablets have poor bioavailability and are not suitable for analgesia. Instranasal usage has been reported in parrots and rabbits. Butorphanol when administered at 0.4 mg/kg given IV/IM does not provide sufficient post-operative analgesia for laparotomy and shoulder arthrotomy in dogs and ovariohysterectomy in bitches. When butorphanol is used as a sedative in dogs—either on its own or with dexmedetomidine—it provides fast sedation and is faster than sedation with methadone. Butorphanol is also approved as an antitussive in the dog.

Butorphanol has antiemetic properties, which counteracts the nausea-induced by dexmedetomidine. Butorphanol's antiemetic properties are greater than that of buprenorphine. Doses of 0.1–0.4 mg/kg IM in cats provides appropriate sedation but greater sedation may be achieved with full μ-opioid receptor agonists. Butorphanol when administered alongside meloxicam, lidocaine, and dexmedetomidine provides appropriate analgesia for orchidectomy and reduces the mean alveolar concentration for isoflurane more than buprenorphine. Butorphanol can reduce the MAC 23–68%.

As a mixed agonist-antagonist butorphanol can reverse some effects of full-opioid such as bradycardia and respiratory depression whilst maintaining analgesia.

Although butorphanol is commonly used for pain relief in reptiles, no studies (as of 2014) have conclusively shown that it is an effective analgesic in reptiles.

=== Use in horses ===
Butorphanol is a narcotic used for pain relief in horses. It is administered either IM or IV, with its analgesic properties beginning to take effect about 15 minutes after injection and lasting 4 hours. In healthy horses butorphanol increases locomotive activity, but the administration of a sedative e.g. xylazine or acepromazine prevents locomotion. In neonatal foals this effect is not observed and instead butorphanol produces sedation. Pre-operative butorphanol administered intravenously at 0.02–0.1 mg/kg provides adequate post-operative analgesia for elective surgeries; however, one study found that pre-operative butorphanol (0.01 mg/kg IV) combined with detomidine did not provide adequate post-operative analgesia.

== See also ==
- κ-Opioid receptor agonist
- Levallorphan
- Nalbuphine
- Nalfurafine
- Nalorphine
- Xorphanol
