= Agonist-antagonist =

Type of drug

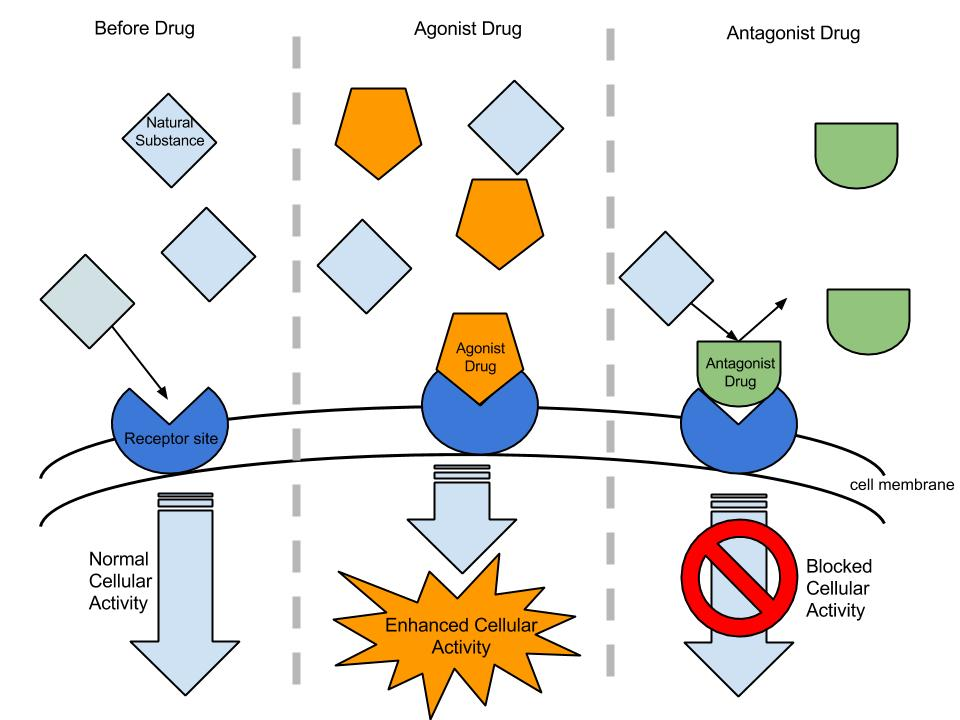
Agonist vs. antagonist

In pharmacology the term agonist-antagonist or mixed agonist/antagonist is used to refer to a drug which under some conditions behaves as an agonist. Which is a substance that fully activates and causes resultant cellular changes in the receptor that it binds to while producing an effect within the cell. While under other conditions, behaves as an antagonist where instead of activating the receptor that it binds to, it blocks the receptor to a natural agonist.

Types of mixed agonist/antagonist include receptor ligands that act as agonist for some receptor types and antagonist for others or agonist in some tissues while antagonist in others (also known as selective receptor modulators).

A Full agonist can produce the largest response that the tissue is capable of giving. When an agonist is a high-efficacy agonist it produces a maximum response even when it occupies a small proportion of receptors. On the other hand, a partial agonist does not have the ability to fully activate the receptors to where it is unable to provide a maximum response.

== Synaptic receptors ==
For synaptic receptors, an agonist is a compound that increases the activation of the receptor by binding directly to it or by increasing the amount of time neurotransmitters are in the synaptic cleft. An antagonist is a compound that has the opposite effect of an agonist. It decreases the activation of a synaptic receptor by binding and blocking neurotransmitters from binding or by decreasing the amount of time neurotransmitters are in the synaptic cleft. These actions can be achieved via multiple mechanisms. A common mechanism for agonists is reuptake inhibition, where the agonist blocks neurotransmitters from reentering the pre-synaptic axon terminal. This gives the neurotransmitter more time in the synaptic cleft to act on the synaptic receptors. Conversely, antagonists often bind directly to receptors in the synaptic cleft, effectively blocking neurotransmitters from binding.

At the alpha adrenoceptors, (R)-3-nitrobiphenyline is an α_{2C} selective agonist as well as being a weak antagonist at the α_{2A} and α_{2B} subtypes.

== Agonist-antagonist opioids ==
The best known agonist-antagonists are opioids. Examples of such opioids are:

- pentazocine, agonist at the kappa (κ) and sigma (σ) with weak antagonist action at the mu opioid receptor (μ)
- butorphanol, pure agonist at κ-opioid receptor, partial agonist at μ-opioid receptor, and antagonist activity at the delta opioid receptor (δ)
- nalbuphine, κ-agonist/μ-antagonist analgesic

Agonist–antagonist opioids usually have a ceiling effect – over particular dose they don't increase their potency. Hence agonist–antagonist opioids have a lower addiction potential but also lower analgesic efficacy and are more likely to produce psychotomimetic effects.

Agonist–antagonist opioids that activate mu opioid receptors while blocking delta produce analgesia without the development of tolerance.

== See also ==
- Competitive antagonist
- Inverse agonist
- Partial agonist
