= Nalbuphine =

Opioid analgesic

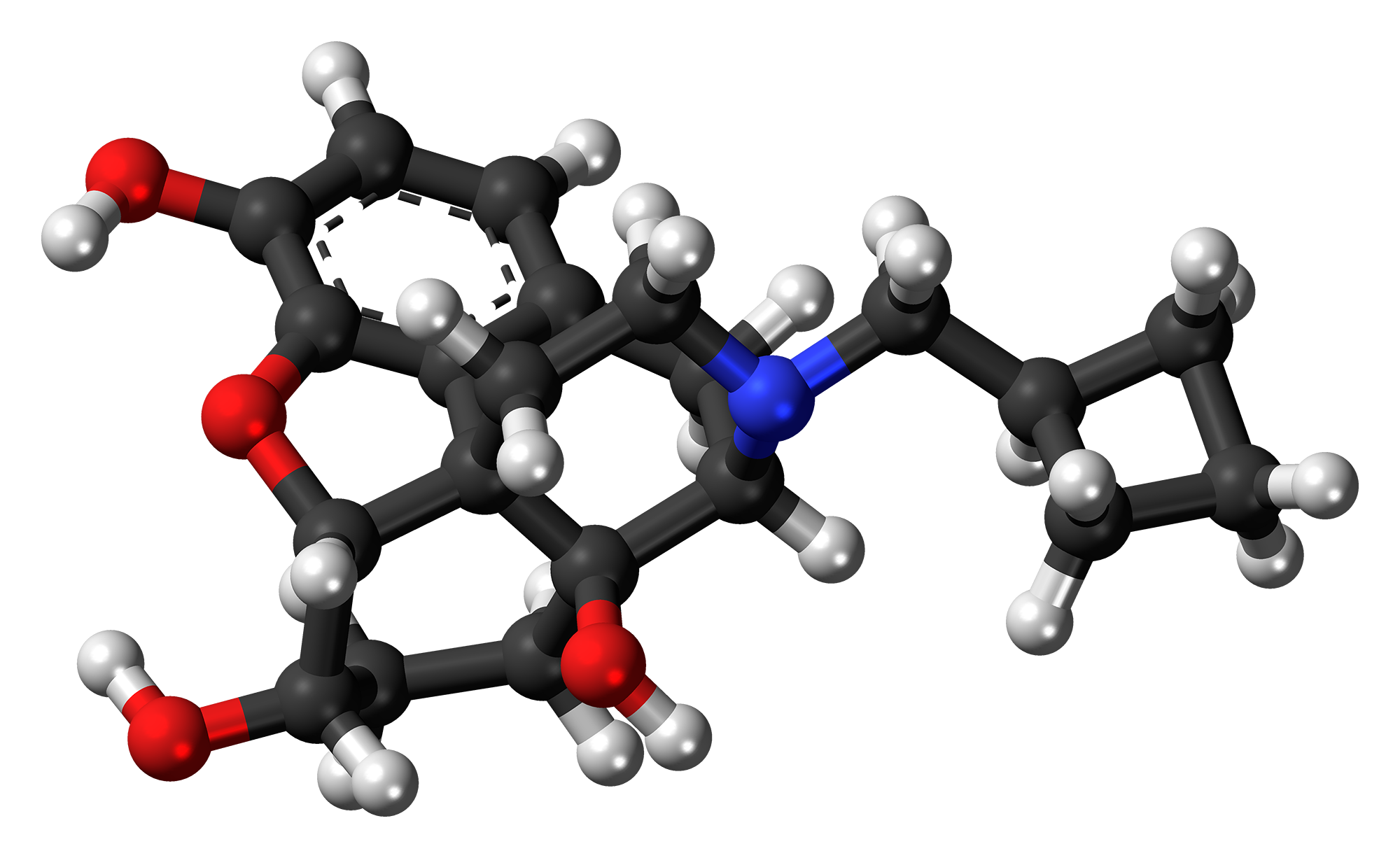

Clinical data
- Trade names: Nubain, Nalpain, Nalbuphin, others
- Other names: EN-2234A; N-Cyclobutylmethyl-14-hydroxydihydronormorphine; 17-Cyclobutylmethyl-4,5α-epoxymorphinan-3,6α,14-triol; N-Cyclobutylmethyl-4,5α-epoxy-3,6α,14-morphinantriol
- AHFS/Drugs.com: Monograph
- MedlinePlus: a682668
- Pregnancy category: B
- Routes of administration: Intravenous, intramuscular, subcutaneous
- Drug class: μ-Opioid receptor agonist–antagonist; κ-Opioid receptor agonist; Opioid analgesic; Hallucinogen
- ATC code: N02AF02 (WHO)

Legal status
- Legal status: AU: S4 (Prescription only); BR: Class A2 (Narcotic drugs); CA: Schedule IV; US: Rx only (unscheduled) Schedule IV in some states; Federally Uncontrolled (RX-only), except in KY, C-IV

Pharmacokinetic data
- Bioavailability: • Oral: 11% (young adults), >44% (elderly) • IM: 81% (10 mg), 83% (20 mg) • SC: 76% (20 mg), 79% (10 mg)
- Protein binding: 50%
- Metabolism: Liver (glucuronidation)
- Metabolites: Glucuronide conjugates (inactive), others
- Onset of action: • Oral: <1 hour • Rectal: <30 minutes • IV: 2–3 minutes • IM: <15 minutes • SC: <15 minutes
- Elimination half-life: ~5 hours (3–6 hours)
- Duration of action: 3–6 hours
- Excretion: Urine, bile, feces; 93% within 6 hours

Identifiers
- IUPAC name: (4R,4aS,7S,7aR,12bS)-3-(cyclobutylmethyl)-1,2,4,5,6,7,7a,13-octahydro-4,12-methanobenzofuro[3,2-e]isoquinoline-4a,7,9-triol
- CAS Number: 20594-83-6
- PubChem CID: 5311304
- IUPHAR/BPS: 1663
- DrugBank: DB00844
- ChemSpider: 4470813
- UNII: L2T84IQI2K
- ChEBI: CHEBI:7454
- ChEMBL: ChEMBL895
- CompTox Dashboard (EPA): DTXSID8023345
- ECHA InfoCard: 100.039.895

Chemical and physical data
- Formula: C_{21}H_{27}NO_{4}
- Molar mass: 357.450 g·mol^{−1}
- 3D model (JSmol): Interactive image
- SMILES: O[C@@H]4[C@@H]5Oc1c2c(ccc1O)C[C@H]3N(CC[C@]25[C@@]3(O)CC4)CC6CCC6
- InChI: InChI=1S/C21H27NO4/c23-14-5-4-13-10-16-21(25)7-6-15(24)19-20(21,17(13)18(14)26-19)8-9-22(16)11-12-2-1-3-12/h4-5,12,15-16,19,23-25H,1-3,6-11H2/t15-,16+,19-,20-,21+/m0/s1; Key:NETZHAKZCGBWSS-CEDHKZHLSA-N

Nalbuphine, sold under the brand names Nubain among others, is an opioid analgesic which is used in the treatment of pain. It is given by injection into a vein, muscle, or fat.

Side effects of nalbuphine include sedation, sweatiness, clamminess, nausea, vomiting, dizziness, vertigo, dry mouth, and headache. Unlike other opioids, it has little to no capacity to cause euphoria or respiratory depression. There is also little to no incidence of dysphoria, dissociation, hallucinations, and related side effects at typical therapeutic doses. Nalbuphine is a mixed agonist/antagonist opioid modulator. Specifically, it acts as a moderate-efficacy partial agonist or antagonist of the μ-opioid receptor (MOR) and as a high-efficacy partial agonist of the κ-opioid receptor (KOR), whereas it has relatively low affinity for the δ-opioid receptor (DOR) and sigma receptors.

Nalbuphine was patented in 1968 and was introduced for medical use in the United States in 1979. It is marketed in many countries throughout the world.

== Medical uses ==
Nalbuphine is indicated for the relief of moderate to severe pain. It can also be used as a supplement to balanced anesthesia, for preoperative and postoperative analgesia, and for obstetrical analgesia during labor and delivery. However, a 2014 Cochrane Systematic Review concluded that from the included studies, there was limited evidence to demonstrate that "0.1 to 0.3 mg/kg nalbuphine compared to placebo might be an effective postoperative analgesic" for pain treatment in children. Further research is therefore needed to compare nalbuphine with other postoperative opioids.

In addition to relieving pain, nalbuphine has been shown to reduce morphine-induced pruritus (itching). Pruritus is a common side effect of morphine and other pure μ-opioid receptor (MOR) agonists. A systematic review of clinical trials concluded that nalbuphine is effective in counteracting morphine-induced pruritus, likely through central nervous system mechanisms.

Evidence suggests that κ-opioid receptor (KOR) activation can counteract MOR-mediated effects in the brain. This interaction may have broader implications for central nervous system disorders, including potential applications in treating Parkinson's disease, where KOR agonism and MOR antagonism have been shown to reduce levodopa-induced dyskinesia and normalize striatal function.

Morphine-induced pruritus may also result from histamine release by mast cells in the skin. Both MORs and KORs are expressed in skin nerves and keratinocytes, indicating potential peripheral mechanisms for opioid-induced pruritus. Histamine-mediated responses such as increased capillary permeability and vasodilation have been observed following intradermal administration of some opioids. However, nalbuphine does not elicit either a wheal or flare response, suggesting it does not promote histamine release from mast cells.

=== Available forms ===
Nalbuphine is available in two concentrations, 10 mg and 20 mg of nalbuphine hydrochloride per mL. Both strengths contain 0.94% sodium citrate hydrous, 1.26% citric acid anhydrous, 0.1% sodium metabisulfite, and 0.2% of a 9:1 mixture of methylparaben and propylparaben as preservatives; pH is adjusted, if necessary, with hydrochloric acid. The 10 mg/mL strength contains 0.1% sodium chloride. The drug is also available in a sulfite and paraben-free formulation in two concentrations, 10 mg and 20 mg of nalbuphine hydrochloride per mL. One mL of each strength contains 0.94% sodium citrate hydrous, 1.26% citric acid anhydrous; pH is adjusted, if necessary, with hydrochloric acid. The 10 mg/mL strength contains 0.2% sodium chloride.

An investigational extended-release oral formulation is under development by Trevi Therapeutics.

== Side effects ==
A 2014 Cochrane Systematic Review by Schnabel et al., concluded that due to limited data, analysis of adverse events for children treated with nalbuphine compared to other opioids or placebo for postoperative pain, could not be definitively reported.

== Overdose ==
In case of overdose or adverse reaction, the immediate intravenous administration of naloxone (Narcan) is a specific antidote. Oxygen, intravenous fluids, vasopressors and other supportive measures should be used as indicated. When administered concurrently with naloxone, nalbuphine is also useful for treating overdoses of potent opioids such as fentanyl, and its highly potent derivatives such as remifentanil and sufentanil, when naloxone alone is insufficient.

== Pharmacology ==
=== Pharmacodynamics ===
Nalbuphine at opioid receptors
Site	K_{i}	EC_{50}	IA	Ref
MOR	0.89 nM	14 nM	47%	
DOR	240 nM	ND	ND	
KOR	2.2 nM	27 nM	81%	

Nalbuphine is a semisynthetic mixed agonist/antagonist opioid modulator of the phenanthrene or morphinan series. It is structurally related to the widely used opioid antagonists naloxone and naltrexone, and to the potent opioid analgesic oxymorphone. Nalbuphine binds with high affinity to the MOR and KOR, and has relatively low affinity for the DOR. It behaves as a moderate-efficacy partial agonist (or mixed agonist/antagonist) of the MOR and as a high-efficacy partial agonist of the KOR. Nalbuphine has weak or no affinity for the sigma receptor(s) (e.g., K_{i} > 100,000 nM).

Nalbuphine is said to be more morphine-like at lower doses. However at higher doses, it produces more sedation, drunkenness, dysphoria, and dissociation. As such, its effects are dose-dependent. Such effects include sedation (21–36%), dizziness or vertigo (5%), lightheadedness (1%), anxiety (<1%), dysphoria (<1%), euphoria (<1%), confusion (<1%), hallucinations (<1%), depersonalization (1%), unusual dreams (<1%), and feelings of "unreality" (<1%).

Nalbuphine is a potent analgesic. Its analgesic potency is essentially equivalent to that of morphine on a milligram basis, which is based on relative potency studies using intramuscular administration (Beaver et al. 1978). Oral administered nalbuphine is reported to be three times more potent than codeine (Okun et al. 1982). Clinical trials studied single dose experimental oral immediate release nalbuphine tablets for analgesic efficacy over a four- to six-hour time period following administration. Nalbuphine in the 15 to 60 mg range had similar analgesic effects to immediate release codeine in the 30 to 60 mg range (Kantor et al. 1984; Sunshine et al. 1983). Schmidt et al. (1985) reviewed the preclinical pharmacology of nalbuphine and reported comparative data relative to other types of opioid compounds. The authors point out that the nalbuphine moiety is approximately ten times more pharmacologically potent than the mixed opioid agonist/antagonist butorphanol on an "antagonist index" scale which quantitates the drug's ability to act both as an analgesic (via opioid KOR agonism) as well as a MOR antagonist. The opioid antagonist activity of nalbuphine is one-fourth as potent as nalorphine and 10 times that of pentazocine.

== Chemistry ==
Nalbuphine is a derivative of morphine and is also known as N-cyclobutylmethyl-14-hydroxydihydronormorphine.

== History ==
Nalbuphine was first synthesized in 1965 and was introduced for medical use in the United States in 1979.

In the search for opioid analgesics with less abuse potential than pure MOR agonist opioids, a number of semisynthetic opioids were developed. These substances are referred to as mixed agonist–antagonists analgesics. Nalbuphine belongs to this group of substances. The mixed agonists-antagonists drug class exerts their analgesic actions by agonistic activity at the KOR. While all drugs in this class possess MOR antagonistic activity leading to less abuse potential, nalbuphine is the only approved drug in the mixed agonist–antagonist class listed in terms of its pharmacological actions and selectivities on opioid receptors as a MOR partial agonist or antagonist as well as a KOR agonist (Gustein et al. 2001).

Nubain was approved for marketing in the United States in 1978 and remains as the only opioid analgesic of this type (marketed in the U.S.) not controlled under the Controlled Substances Act (CSA). When the Controlled Substances Act (CSA) was enacted in 1971, nalbuphine was placed in schedule II. Endo Laboratories, Inc. subsequently petitioned the DEA to exclude nalbuphine from all schedules of the CSA in 1973. After receiving a medical and scientific review and a scheduling recommendation from the Department of Health, Education and Welfare, forerunner to the Department of Health and Human Services, nalbuphine was removed from schedule II of the CSA in 1976. Presently, nalbuphine is not a controlled substance under the CSA.

Nalbuphine HCL is currently available only as an injectable in the US and the European Union. Nubain, the Astra USA brand name for injectable nalbuphine HCL, was discontinued from being marketed in 2008 in the United States for commercial reasons (Federal Register 2008); however, other commercial suppliers now provide generic injection formulation nalbuphine for the market.

== Society and culture ==
=== Brand names ===
Nalbuphine is marketed primarily under the brand names Nubain, Nalpain, and Nalbuphin. It is also marketed under the brand name Nalufin in Egypt and Nalbun in Bangladesh by Incepta Pharma Limited, under the brand name Rubuphine in India by Rusan Healthcare Pvt Ltd, under the brand name Kinz and Nalbin in Pakistan by Sami and Global Pharmaceuticals, under the brand name Analin by Medicaids in Pakistan, and under the brand name Exnal by Indus Pharma in Pakistan, among many others.

=== Legal status ===
Unlike many other opioids, nalbuphine has a limited potential for euphoria, and in accordance, is rarely abused. This is because whereas MOR agonists produce euphoria, MOR antagonists do not, and KOR agonists like nalbuphine moreover actually produce dysphoria. Nalbuphine was initially designated as a Schedule II controlled substance in the United States along with other opioids upon the introduction of the 1970 Controlled Substances Act. However, its manufacturer, Endo Laboratories, Inc., petitioned the Food and Drug Administration to remove it from Schedule II in 1973, and after a medical and scientific review, nalbuphine was removed completely from the Controlled Substances Act in 1976 and is not a controlled substance in the United States today. For comparison, MOR full agonists are all Schedule II in the United States, whereas the mixed KOR and MOR agonists/antagonists butorphanol and pentazocine are Schedule IV in the United States. In Canada, most opioids are classified as Schedule I, but nalbuphine and butorphanol are both listed as Schedule IV substances.

== Veterinary use ==
There is limited data on nalbuphine's use in the dog, and even less for that of other animals. Nalbuphine induces sedation and analgesia in the dog but is less effective compared to μ-opioid receptor agonists. Nalbuphine has minimal effect on the cardiovascular system. The sedation provided by nalbuphine is insufficient for catheterisation and fur clipping and the analgesic effect is insufficient for some pain. Both sedative and analgesic effects of nalbuphine are subject to a ceiling effect. Combination of nalbuphine with an α_{2}-adrenergic receptor agonist or acepromazine provides greater sedation. One study found that acepromazine and nalbuphine failed to provide adequate analgesia both during and post-surgery in bitches undergoing ovariohysterectomy. Although one study found epidural nalbuphine to provide adequate analgesia there is limited evidence to support epidural administration of nalbuphine. Ophthalmic administration is not recommended in any species as multiple studies demonstrated no analgesia following topical ophthalmic administration.

In cats nalbuphine has been shown to provide an equal sedative effect to butorphanol when adminsistered with acepromazine and an equal sedative and analgesic effect when combined with dexmedetomidine and tiletamine-zolazepam respectively.

In horses evidence is mixed. One study found that nalbuphine combined with xylazine was more effective than xylazine by itself as an analgesic and anaesthetic, but another study found no difference between xylazine itself and xylazine with nalbuphine.

Evidence in livestock is limited. One study in Holstein calves following castration found nalbuphine to provide inadequate analgesia and sedation. In goats one study found that nalbuphine combined with ketamine provided better post-operative analgesia than ketamine by itself at a higher dose.

== See also ==
- κ-Opioid receptor agonist
- Dinalbuphine sebacate
- Samidorphan
- Pain management in children
