= Levallorphan =

Opioid medication

Clinical data
- AHFS/Drugs.com: International Drug Names
- Routes of administration: Oral
- ATC code: None

Legal status
- Legal status: In general: ℞ (Prescription only)

Identifiers
- IUPAC name: (−)-17-allylmorphinan-3-ol
- CAS Number: 152-02-3
- PubChem CID: 5359371
- IUPHAR/BPS: 7209
- DrugBank: DB00504
- ChemSpider: 4514267
- UNII: 353613BU4U
- ChEMBL: ChEMBL1254682
- CompTox Dashboard (EPA): DTXSID9023205
- ECHA InfoCard: 100.005.273

Chemical and physical data
- Formula: C_{19}H_{25}NO
- Molar mass: 283.415 g·mol^{−1}
- 3D model (JSmol): Interactive image
- SMILES: Oc1ccc3c(c1)[C@@]24[C@H]([C@H](N(CC2)C\C=C)C3)CCCC4
- InChI: InChI=1S/C19H25NO/c1-2-10-20-11-9-19-8-4-3-5-16(19)18(20)12-14-6-7-15(21)13-17(14)19/h2,6-7,13,16,18,21H,1,3-5,8-12H2/t16-,18-,19-/m0/s1; Key:OZYUPQUCAUTOBP-WDSOQIARSA-N

Levallorphan (INN, BAN; USAN levallorphan tartrate; brand names Lorfan, Naloxifan, and Naloxiphan) is an opioid modulator of the morphinan family used as an opioid analgesic and opioid antagonist/antidote. It acts as an antagonist of the μ-opioid receptor (MOR) and as an agonist of the κ-opioid receptor (KOR), and as a result, blocks the effects of stronger agents with greater intrinsic activity such as morphine whilst simultaneously producing analgesia.

Levallorphan was formerly widely used in general anesthesia, mainly to reverse the respiratory depression produced by opioid analgesics and barbiturates used for induction of surgical anaesthesia whilst maintaining a degree of analgesia (via KOR agonism). It is now less commonly employed for this purpose as the newer drug naloxone tends to be used instead. Levallorphan was also used in combination with opioid analgesics to reduce their side effects, mainly in obstetrics, and a very small dose of levallorphan used alongside a full agonist of the MOR can produce greater analgesia than when the latter is used by itself. The combination of levallorphan with pethidine (meperidine) was indeed used so frequently, a standardized formulation was made available, known as Pethilorfan.

As an agonist of the KOR, levallorphan can produce severe mental reactions at sufficient doses including hallucinations, dissociation, and other psychotomimetic effects, dysphoria, anxiety, confusion, dizziness, disorientation, derealization, feelings of drunkenness, delusions, paranoia, and bizarre, unusual, or disturbing dreams.

== See also ==
- Propallorphan
