= Oxprenolol =

Non-selective beta blocker

Clinical data
- Trade names: Trasicor, others
- AHFS/Drugs.com: Micromedex Detailed Consumer Information
- Pregnancy category: AU: C
- Routes of administration: By mouth
- ATC code: C07AA02 (WHO)

Legal status
- Legal status: In general: ℞ (Prescription only)

Pharmacokinetic data
- Bioavailability: 20–70%
- Metabolism: Liver
- Elimination half-life: 1–2 hours
- Excretion: Kidney; Lactic (in lactiferous females)

Identifiers
- IUPAC name: (RS)-1-[2-(allyloxy)phenoxy]-3-(isopropylamino)propan-2-ol
- CAS Number: 6452-71-7
- PubChem CID: 4631
- IUPHAR/BPS: 7255
- DrugBank: DB01580
- ChemSpider: 4470
- UNII: 519MXN9YZR
- KEGG: D08318
- ChEMBL: ChEMBL546
- CompTox Dashboard (EPA): DTXSID1043835
- ECHA InfoCard: 100.026.598

Chemical and physical data
- Formula: C_{15}H_{23}NO_{3}
- Molar mass: 265.353 g·mol^{−1}
- 3D model (JSmol): Interactive image
- Chirality: Racemic mixture
- SMILES: O(c1ccccc1OC\C=C)CC(O)CNC(C)C
- InChI: InChI=1S/C15H23NO3/c1-4-9-18-14-7-5-6-8-15(14)19-11-13(17)10-16-12(2)3/h4-8,12-13,16-17H,1,9-11H2,2-3H3; Key:CEMAWMOMDPGJMB-UHFFFAOYSA-N

Oxprenolol, sold under the brand name Trasicor among others, is a non-selective beta blocker with some intrinsic sympathomimetic activity. It was used for the treatment of angina pectoris, abnormal heart rhythms, and high blood pressure.

== Medical uses ==
Oxprenolol has been used in the treatment of angina pectoris, abnormal heart rhythms, and high blood pressure.

It has been used to treat anxiety as well.

== Contraindications ==
Oxprenolol is a potent beta blocker and should not be administered to asthmatics under any circumstances due to their low beta levels as a result of depletion due to other asthma medication, and because it can cause irreversible, often fatal, airway failure and inflammation.

== Pharmacology ==
=== Pharmacodynamics ===
Oxprenolol is a beta blocker. In addition, it has been found to act as an antagonist of the serotonin 5-HT_{1A} and 5-HT_{1B} receptors with respective K_{i} values of 94.2 nM and 642 nM in rat brain tissue.

=== Pharmacokinetics ===
Oxprenolol is a lipophilic beta blocker which passes the blood–brain barrier more easily than hydrophilic beta blockers. As such, it is associated with a higher incidence of CNS-related side effects than beta blockers with more hydrophilic molecules such as atenolol, sotalol, and nadolol. The brain-to-blood ratio of oxprenolol in humans has been found to be 50:1. For comparison, the brain-to-blood ratio of the highly lipophilic propranolol was 15:1 to 26:1 and of the hydrophilic atenolol was 0.2:1.

== Chemistry ==
The experimental log P of oxprenolol is 2.10.

=== Stereochemistry ===
Oxprenolol is a chiral compound, the beta blocker is used as a racemate, e. g. a 1:1 mixture of (R)-(+)-oxprenolol and (S)-(–)-oxprenolol. Analytical methods (HPLC) for the separation and quantification of (R)-(+)-oxprenolol and (S)-(–)-oxprenolol in urine and in pharmaceutical formulations have been described in the literature.

(R)-(+)-Oxprenolol (top) and (S)-(–)-oxprenolol

== Society and culture ==
=== Brand names ===
Brand names of oxprenolol include Trasacor, Trasicor, Coretal, Laracor, Slow-Pren, Captol, Corbeton, Slow-Trasicor, Tevacor, Trasitensin, and Trasidex.
