= Cicloprolol =

Chemical compound

Clinical data
- Other names: Cycloprolol; SL-75177

Identifiers
- IUPAC name: 1-[4-[2-(cyclopropylmethoxy)ethoxy]phenoxy]-3-(propan-2-ylamino)propan-2-ol
- CAS Number: 63659-12-1
- PubChem CID: 146294
- IUPHAR/BPS: 552
- ChemSpider: 129044
- UNII: 1K2ACH4U3R
- KEGG: D03490
- ChEBI: CHEBI:135377
- ChEMBL: ChEMBL2110772
- CompTox Dashboard (EPA): DTXSID70867026

Chemical and physical data
- Formula: C_{18}H_{29}NO_{4}
- Molar mass: 323.433 g·mol^{−1}
- 3D model (JSmol): Interactive image
- SMILES: CC(C)NCC(COC1=CC=C(C=C1)OCCOCC2CC2)O
- InChI: InChI=1S/C18H29NO4/c1-14(2)19-11-16(20)13-23-18-7-5-17(6-8-18)22-10-9-21-12-15-3-4-15/h5-8,14-16,19-20H,3-4,9-13H2,1-2H3; Key:JNDJPKHYZWRRIS-UHFFFAOYSA-N

Cicloprolol (INN; developmental code name SL-75177), or cycloprolol (BAN), is a β-adrenergic receptor antagonist (beta blocker) described as an antihypertensive agent which was never marketed. It has weak partial agonist or intrinsic sympathomimetic activity (30%) at the β-adrenergic receptors. This is higher than that of many other beta blockers but is lower than that of xamoterol (45%). The drug is selective for the β_{1}-adrenergic receptor. It has been studied in the treatment of heart failure.

== Chemistry ==
The chemical structure of cicloprolol is very similar to that of betaxolol.

=== Synthesis ===
Cicloprolol can be synthesized starting from 4-benzyloxyphenol.

Cicloprolol synthesis
