= Nebivolol =

Chemical compound

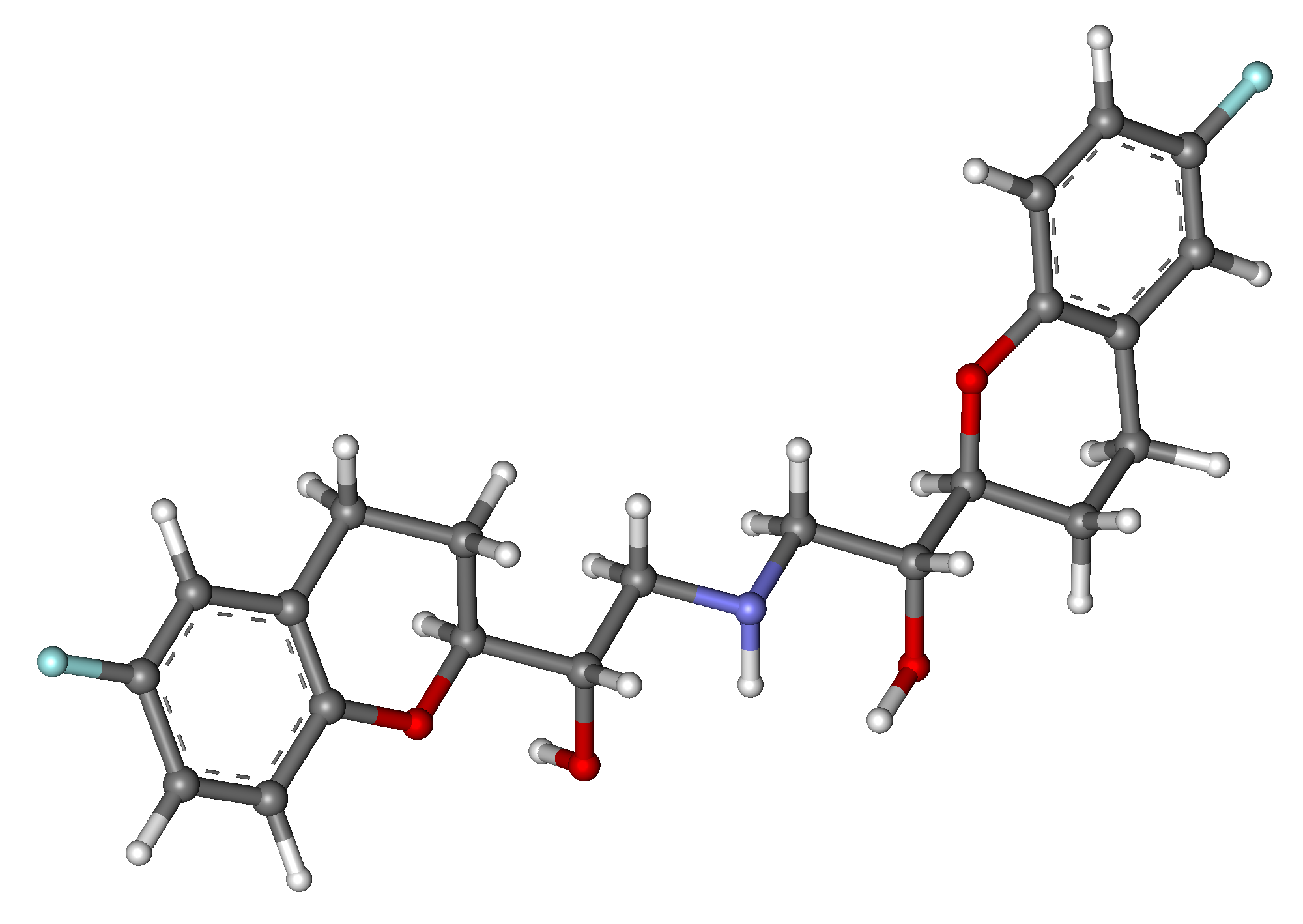

Clinical data
- Trade names: Nebilet, Bystolic, others
- Other names: Narbivolol, Nebivolol, Nebivololum
- AHFS/Drugs.com: Monograph
- MedlinePlus: a608029
- License data: US DailyMed: Nebivolol
- Pregnancy category: AU: C
- Routes of administration: By mouth
- ATC code: C07AB12 (WHO)

Legal status
- Legal status: AU: S4 (Prescription only); UK: POM (Prescription only); US: ℞-only

Pharmacokinetic data
- Protein binding: 98%
- Metabolism: Liver (CYP2D6-mediated)
- Elimination half-life: 12-19 hours
- Excretion: Kidney and fecal

Identifiers
- IUPAC name: 2,2'-iminobis[1-(6-fluoro-3,4-dihydro-2H-1-benzopyran-2-yl)ethanol]
- CAS Number: 118457-14-0
- PubChem CID: 71301
- IUPHAR/BPS: 7246
- DrugBank: DB04861
- ChemSpider: 64421
- UNII: 030Y90569U
- KEGG: D05127; as HCl: D06622
- ChEMBL: ChEMBL434394
- CompTox Dashboard (EPA): DTXSID9040556

Chemical and physical data
- Formula: C_{22}H_{25}F_{2}NO_{4}
- Molar mass: 405.442 g·mol^{−1}
- 3D model (JSmol): Interactive image
- SMILES: Fc4cc1c(OC(CC1)C(O)CNCC(O)C3Oc2ccc(F)cc2CC3)cc4
- InChI: InChI=1S/C22H25F2NO4/c23-15-3-7-19-13(9-15)1-5-21(28-19)17(26)11-25-12-18(27)22-6-2-14-10-16(24)4-8-20(14)29-22/h3-4,7-10,17-18,21-22,25-27H,1-2,5-6,11-12H2; Key:KOHIRBRYDXPAMZ-UHFFFAOYSA-N

Nebivolol is a beta blocker used to treat high blood pressure and heart failure. As with other β-blockers, it is generally a less preferred treatment for high blood pressure. It may be used by itself or with other blood pressure medication. It is taken by mouth.

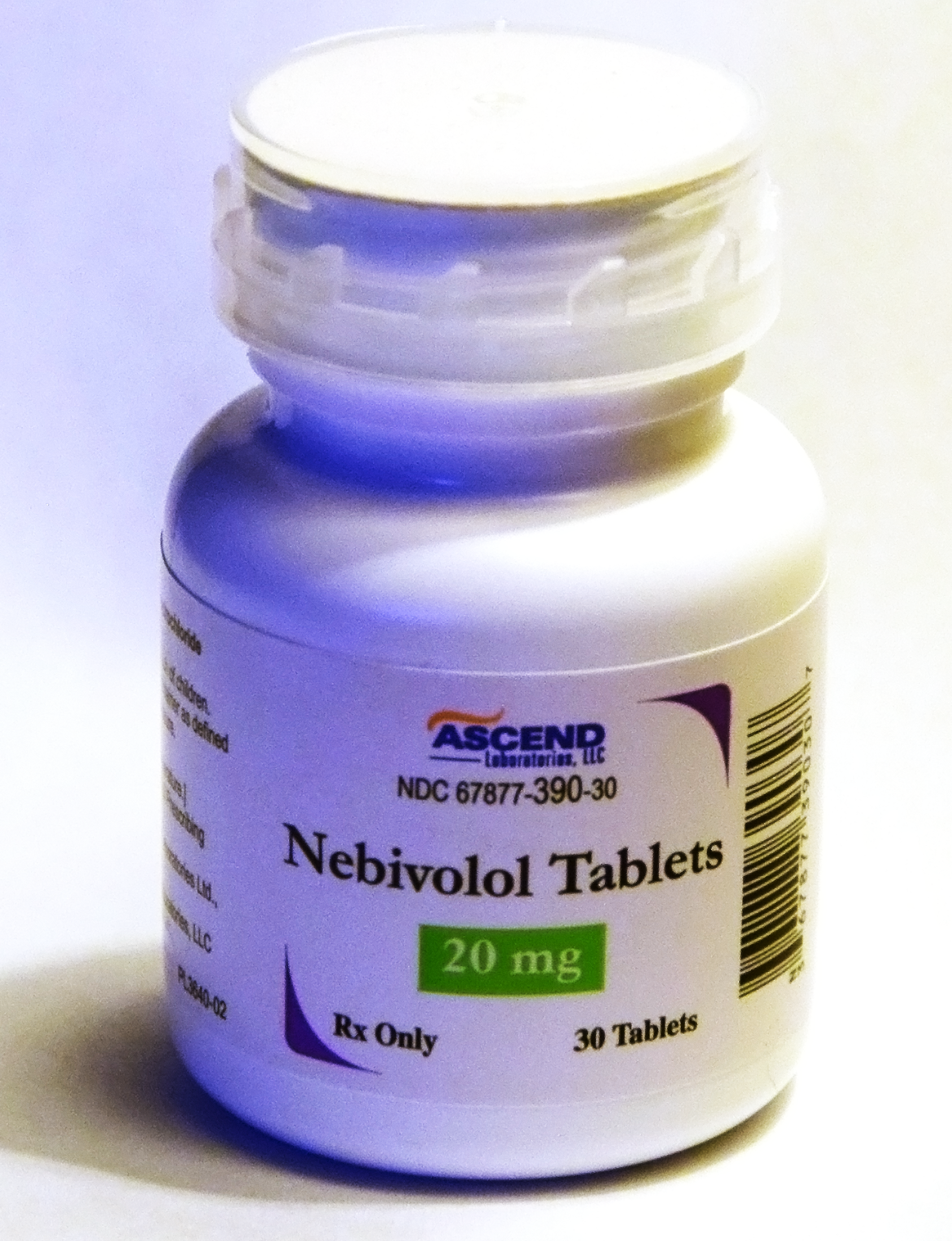
A bottle of 20mg nebivolol tablets

Common side effects include dizziness, feeling tired, nausea, and headaches. Serious side effects may include heart failure and bronchospasm. Its use in pregnancy and breastfeeding is not recommended. It works by blocking β_{1}-adrenergic receptors in the heart and dilating blood vessels.

Nebivolol was patented in 1983 and came into medical use in 1997. It is available as a generic medication in the United Kingdom. In 2023, it was the 191st most commonly prescribed medication in the United States, with more than 2 million prescriptions.

== Medical uses ==
It is used to treat high blood pressure and heart failure. Nebivolol is used in the treatment of angina, to decrease the heart rate and contractile force. This is relevant in patients who need to decrease the oxygen demand of the heart so that the blood supplied from stenosed or constricted arteries is adequate.

ACE inhibitors, angiotensin II receptor antagonists, calcium-channel blockers, and thiazide diuretics are generally preferred over beta blockers for the treatment of primary hypertension in the absence of co-morbidities.

== Contraindications ==
- Severe bradycardia
- Heart block greater than first degree
- Patients with cardiogenic shock
- Decompensated cardiac failure
- Sick sinus syndrome (unless a permanent pacemaker is in place)
- Patients with severe hepatic impairment (Child-Pugh class B)
- Patients who are hypersensitive to any component of this product.

== Side effects ==
Side effects might include headache, tiredness, dizziness, lightheadedness, reduced blood flow to extremities, bradycardia.

== Interactions ==
Due to enzymatic inhibition, fluvoxamine increases the exposure to nebivolol and its active hydroxylated metabolite (4-OH-nebivolol) in healthy volunteers.

== Pharmacology ==
=== Pharmacodynamics ===
==== β_{1}-selectivity ====
Beta blockers help patients with cardiovascular disease by blocking β1 receptors, while many of the side-effects of these medications are caused by their blockade of β2 receptors. For this reason, beta blockers that selectively block β1 adrenergic receptors (termed cardioselective or β1-selective beta blockers) produce fewer adverse effects (for instance, bronchoconstriction) than those drugs that non-selectively block both β1 and β2 receptors.

In a laboratory experiment conducted on biopsied heart tissue, nebivolol proved to be the most β1-selective of the β-blockers tested, being approximately 3.5 times more β1-selective than bisoprolol. However, the drug's receptor selectivity in humans is more complex and depends on the drug dose and the genetic profile of the patient taking the medication. The drug is highly cardioselective at 5 mg. In addition, at doses above 10 mg, nebivolol loses its cardioselectivity and blocks both β1 and β2 receptors, while the recommended starting dose of nebivolol is 5 mg, sufficient control of blood pressure may require doses up to 40 mg. Furthermore, nebivolol is also not cardioselective when taken by patients with a genetic makeup that makes them "poor metabolizers" of nebivolol (and other drugs) or with CYP2D6 inhibitors. As many as 1 in 10 Caucasian people and even more black people are poor CYP2D6 metabolizers and therefore might benefit less from nebivolol's cardioselectivity although currently there are no directly comparable studies.

Nebivolol, while selectively blocking beta(1) receptors, acts as a beta(3)-agonist. β_{3} receptors are found in the gallbladder, urinary bladder, and in brown adipose tissue. Their role in gallbladder physiology is unknown, but they are thought to play a role in lipolysis and thermogenesis in brown fat. In the urinary bladder it is thought to cause relaxation of the bladder and prevention of urination.

==== Vasodilator action ====
Nebivolol is unique as a beta-blocker. Unlike carvedilol, it has a nitric oxide (NO)-potentiating, vasodilatory effect via stimulation of β3 receptors.

Nebivolol induces vasodilation by stimulating the production of nitric oxide, a natural blood vessel relaxant. This effect is achieved by activating the endothelial isoform of NO synthase (eNOS) in the cells lining the blood vessels. Unlike traditional β-blockers, nebivolol's unique mechanism of action improves arterial flexibility and reduces peripheral resistance, making it beneficial for hypertensive patients with endothelial dysfunction. The drug's ability to increase NO production persists even after metabolism, offering long-lasting benefits. Nebivolol's distinct approach to promoting NO release has shown promising results in improving endothelial function and managing hypertension in clinical trials.

Along with labetalol, celiprolol and carvedilol, it is one of four beta blockers to cause dilation of blood vessels in addition to effects on the heart.

==== Antihypertensive effect ====
Nebivolol lowers blood pressure (BP) by reducing peripheral vascular resistance, and significantly increases stroke volume with preservation of cardiac output. The net hemodynamic effect of nebivolol is the result of a balance between the depressant effects of beta-blockade and an action that maintains cardiac output. Antihypertensive responses were significantly higher with nebivolol than with placebo in trials enrolling patient groups considered representative of the U.S. hypertensive population, in black people, and in those receiving concurrent treatment with other antihypertensive drugs.

=== Pharmacokinetics ===
Nebivolol's plasma protein binding is approximately 98%, mostly to albumin and its elimination half-life of low doses is 12 hours in extensive CYP2D6 metabolizers and 19 hours in poor metabolizers. It crosses the blood–brain barrier and exerts effects in the central nervous system. This may result in central side effects such as depression, insomnia, and nightmares.

== Chemistry ==
The experimental log P of nebivolol is 4.18 and its predicted log P ranges from 2.44 to 4.21. It is a highly lipophilic beta blocker. The drug showed the fourth highest predicted lipophilicity of 30 clinically relevant beta blockers, with the most lipophilic beta blockers predicted to be bopindolol, penbutolol, and carvedilol.

== Society and culture ==
=== Brand names and marketing ===
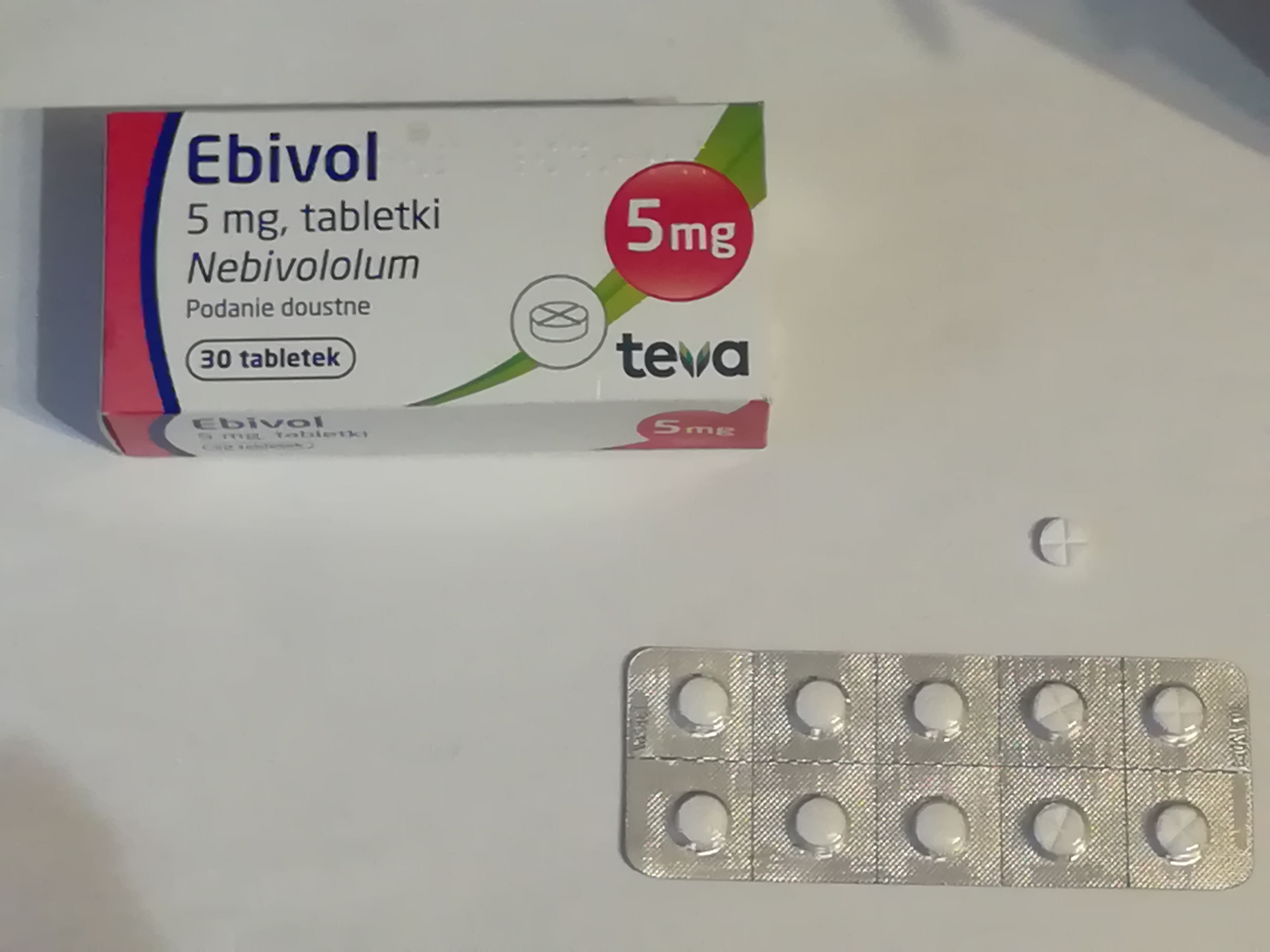
Ebivol (Nebivolol) tablets.

Mylan Laboratories licensed the US and Canadian rights to nebivolol from Janssen Pharmaceutica N.V. in 2001. Nebivolol is already registered and successfully marketed in more than 50 countries, including the United States where it is marketed under the brand name Bystolic from Mylan Laboratories and Forest Laboratories. Nebivolol is manufactured by Forest Laboratories.

In India, nebivolol is available as Nebula (Zydus Healthcare Ltd), Nebizok (Eris life-sciences), Nebicip (Cipla ltd), Nebilong (Micro Labs), Nebistar (Lupin ltd), Nebicard (Torrent), Nubeta (Abbott Healthcare Pvt Ltd – India), and Nodon (Cadila Pharmaceuticals).

In Greece and Italy, nebivolol is marketed by Menarini as Lobivon.

In Germany it is marketed as Nebilet by Berlin Chemie.

In the Middle East, Russia and Australia, it is marketed under the name Nebilet and in Pakistan it is marketed by The Searle Company Limited as Byscard.

=== Controversies ===
==== Tolerability claims ====
Several studies have suggested that nebivolol has reduced typical beta-blocker-related side effects, such as fatigue, clinical depression, bradycardia, or impotence. However, according to the FDA

Bystolic is associated with a number of serious risks. Bystolic is contraindicated in patients with severe bradycardia, heart block greater than first degree, cardiogenic shock, decompensated cardiac failure, sick sinus syndrome (unless a permanent pacemaker is in place), severe hepatic impairment (Child-Pugh > B) and in patients who are hypersensitive to any component of the product. Bystolic therapy is also associated with warnings regarding abrupt cessation of therapy, cardiac failure, angina and acute myocardial infarction, bronchospastic diseases, anesthesia and major surgery, diabetes and hypoglycemia, thyrotoxicosis, peripheral vascular disease, non-dihydropyridine calcium channel blockers use, as well as precautions regarding use with CYP2D6 inhibitors, impaired renal and hepatic function, and anaphylactic reactions. Finally, Bystolic is associated with other risks as described in the Adverse Reactions section of its PI. For example, a number of treatment-emergent adverse events with an incidence greater than or equal to 1 percent in Bystolic-treated patients and at a higher frequency than placebo-treated patients were identified in clinical studies, including headache, fatigue, and dizziness.

==== FDA warning letter about advertising claims ====
In August 2008, the FDA issued a Warning Letter to Forest Laboratories citing exaggerated and misleading claims in their launch journal ad, in particular over claims of superiority and novelty of action.
