= Dihydrobunolol dehydrogenase =

dihydrobunolol dehydrogenase

Identifiers
- EC no.: 1.1.1.160
- CAS no.: 62213-61-0

Databases
- IntEnz: IntEnz view
- BRENDA: BRENDA entry
- ExPASy: NiceZyme view
- KEGG: KEGG entry
- MetaCyc: metabolic pathway
- PRIAM: profile
- PDB structures: RCSB PDB PDBe PDBsum
- Gene Ontology: AmiGO / QuickGO
Search
- PMC: articles
- PubMed: articles
- NCBI: proteins

In enzymology, dihydrobunolol dehydrogenase (EC 1.1.1.160) is an enzyme that catalyzes the chemical reaction

dihydrobunolol
+ NADP^{+}
H^{+}
H^{+}
bunolol
+ NADPH

The two substrates of this enzyme are dihydrobunolol and oxidised nicotinamide adenine dinucleotide phosphate (NADP^{+}). Its products are bunolol, reduced NADPH, and a proton.

This enzyme belongs to the family of oxidoreductases, specifically those acting on the CH-OH group of donor with NAD^{+} or NADP^{+} as acceptor. The systematic name of this enzyme class is (+/−)-5-[(tert-butylamino)-2'-hydroxypropoxy]-1,2,3,4-tetrahydro-1-naphthol:NADP^{+} oxidoreductase. This enzyme is also termed bunolol reductase.
