= Betaxolol =

Chemical compound

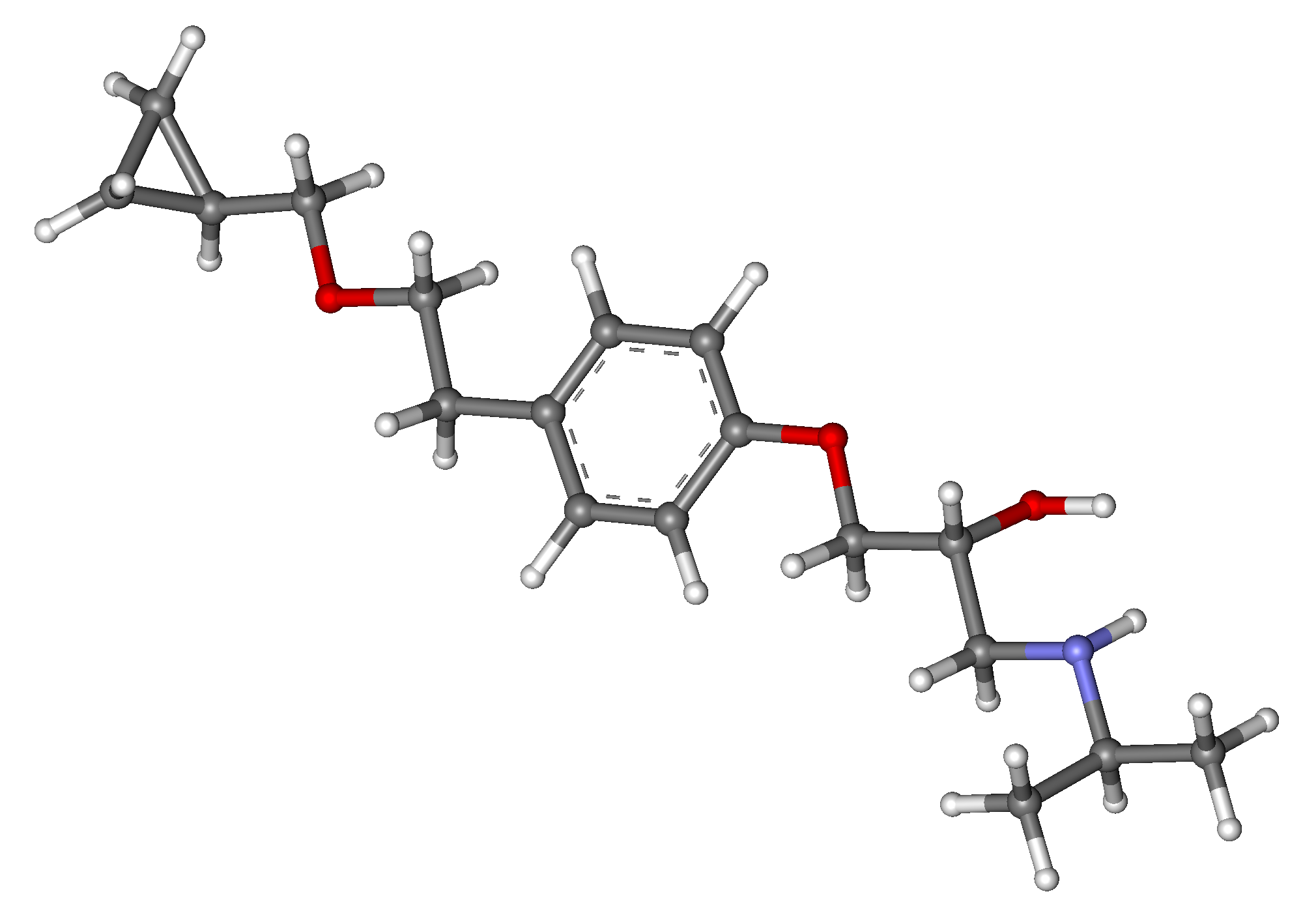

Clinical data
- Trade names: Kerlone
- AHFS/Drugs.com: Monograph
- MedlinePlus: a609023
- Pregnancy category: AU: C
- Routes of administration: By mouth, ocular
- Drug class: Beta blocker; β-Adrenergic receptor antagonist; Selective β_{1}-adrenergic receptor antagonist
- ATC code: C07AB05 (WHO) S01ED02 (WHO)

Legal status
- Legal status: In general: ℞ (Prescription only)

Pharmacokinetic data
- Bioavailability: 89%
- Metabolism: Liver
- Elimination half-life: 14–22 hours
- Excretion: Kidney (20%)

Identifiers
- IUPAC name: (RS)-1-{4-[2-(cyclopropylmethoxy)ethyl]- phenoxy}-3-(isopropylamino)propan-2-ol
- CAS Number: 63659-18-7
- PubChem CID: 2369
- IUPHAR/BPS: 549
- DrugBank: DB00195
- ChemSpider: 2279
- UNII: O0ZR1R6RZ2
- KEGG: D07526
- ChEBI: CHEBI:3082
- ChEMBL: ChEMBL423
- CompTox Dashboard (EPA): DTXSID2022674
- ECHA InfoCard: 100.113.058

Chemical and physical data
- Formula: C_{18}H_{29}NO_{3}
- Molar mass: 307.434 g·mol^{−1}
- 3D model (JSmol): Interactive image
- Chirality: Racemic mixture
- SMILES: O(CCc1ccc(OCC(O)CNC(C)C)cc1)CC2CC2
- InChI: InChI=1S/C18H29NO3/c1-14(2)19-11-17(20)13-22-18-7-5-15(6-8-18)9-10-21-12-16-3-4-16/h5-8,14,16-17,19-20H,3-4,9-13H2,1-2H3; Key:NWIUTZDMDHAVTP-UHFFFAOYSA-N

Betaxolol is a beta blocker used in the treatment of hypertension and angina.

It acts as a selective β_{1}-adrenergic receptor antagonist.

The drug was patented in 1975 and approved for medical use in 1983.

== Medical uses ==
=== Hypertension ===
Betaxolol is most commonly ingested orally alone or with other medications for the management of essential hypertension. It is a cardioselective beta blocker, targeting beta-1 adrenergic receptors found in the cardiac muscle. Blood pressure is decreased by the mechanism of blood vessels relaxing and improving the flow of blood.

=== Glaucoma ===
Ophthalmic betaxolol is an available treatment for primary open angle glaucoma (POAG) and optical hypertension. Betaxolol effectively prevents the increase of intracellular calcium, which leads to increased production of the aqueous humor. In the context of open angle glaucoma, increased aqueous humor produced by ciliary bodies increases intraocular pressure, causing degeneration of retinal ganglion cells and the optic nerve.

Furthermore, betaxolol is additionally able to protect retinal neurones following topical application from excitotoxicity or ischemia-reperfusion, providing a neuroprotective effect. This is thought to be attributed to its capacity to attenuate neuronal calcium and sodium influx. Betaxolol is also an effective treatment for Intraocular pressure

=== Other uses ===
Betaxolol has been used to treat anxiety as well.

One study showed that topical betaxolol can be used in treating relapsed paronychia.

== Contraindications ==
- Hypersensitivity to the drug
- Patients with sinus bradycardia, heart block greater than first degree, cardiogenic shock, and overt cardiac failure

== Side effects ==
The adverse side effects of betaxolol can be categorized into local and systemic effects. The local effects include:

- transient irritation (20-40% of patients)
- burning
- pruritus, or general itching
- punctate keratitis
- blurry vision

Systemically, patients taking betaxolol might experience:

- bradycardia
- hypotension
- fatigue
- sexual impotence
- hair loss
- confusion
- headache
- dizziness
- bronchospasm at higher doses
- cardiac problems such as arrhythmia, bundle branch block, myocardial infarction, sinus arrest, and congestive heart failure
- mental effects such as depression, disorientation, vertigo, sleepwalking, rhinitis
- dysuria
- metabolic side effects such as an increase in LDL cholesterol levels
- can mask the symptoms of hypoglycemia diabetic patients

== Pharmacology ==
=== Pharmacodynamics ===
Betaxolol is a beta blocker and acts specifically as a selective β_{1}-adrenergic receptor antagonist. It has no partial agonist action (i.e., intrinsic sympathomimetic activity) and shows minimal membrane-stabilizing activity (i.e., sodium channel blockade or local anesthetic activity). Being selective for beta_{1} receptors, it typically has fewer systemic side effects than non-selective beta-blockers, for example, not causing bronchospasm (mediated by beta_{2} receptors) as timolol may. Betaxolol also shows greater affinity for beta_{1} receptors than metoprolol. In addition to its effect on the heart, betaxolol reduces the pressure within the eye (intraocular pressure). This effect is thought to be caused by reducing the production of the liquid (which is called the aqueous humor) within the eye. The precise mechanism of this effect is not known. The reduction in intraocular pressure reduces the risk of damage to the optic nerve and loss of vision in patients with elevated intraocular pressure due to glaucoma.

== Chemistry ==
The experimental log P of betaxolol is 2.4 to 2.81.

== History ==
Betaxolol was approved by the U.S. Food and Drug Administration (FDA) for ocular use as a 0.5% solution (Betoptic) in 1985 and as a 0.25% solution (Betoptic S) in 1989.

== Society and culture ==
=== Brand names ===
Brand names include Betoptic, Betoptic S, Lokren, Kerlone.

== See also ==
- Levobetaxolol
- Cicloprolol
