= Carteolol =

Chemical compound

Clinical data
- Trade names: Ocupress
- AHFS/Drugs.com: Professional Drug Facts
- MedlinePlus: a601078
- License data: US DailyMed: Carteolol
- Routes of administration: Eye drops
- ATC code: C07AA15 (WHO) S01ED05 (WHO)

Legal status
- Legal status: US: ℞-only; In general: ℞ (Prescription only)

Pharmacokinetic data
- Bioavailability: 85%
- Metabolism: Liver, active with 8-hydrocarteolol
- Elimination half-life: 6–8 hours
- Excretion: Kidney (50–70%)

Identifiers
- IUPAC name: (RS)-5-[3-(tert-butylamino)-2-hydroxypropoxy]-3,4-dihydroquinolin-2(1H)-one
- CAS Number: 51781-06-7
- PubChem CID: 2583
- IUPHAR/BPS: 7142
- DrugBank: DB00521
- ChemSpider: 2485
- UNII: 8NF31401XG
- KEGG: D07624
- ChEBI: CHEBI:3437
- ChEMBL: ChEMBL839
- CompTox Dashboard (EPA): DTXSID3022746

Chemical and physical data
- Formula: C_{16}H_{24}N_{2}O_{3}
- Molar mass: 292.379 g·mol^{−1}
- 3D model (JSmol): Interactive image
- Chirality: Racemic mixture
- SMILES: O=C2Nc1cccc(OCC(O)CNC(C)(C)C)c1CC2
- InChI: InChI=1S/C16H24N2O3/c1-16(2,3)17-9-11(19)10-21-14-6-4-5-13-12(14)7-8-15(20)18-13/h4-6,11,17,19H,7-10H2,1-3H3,(H,18,20); Key:LWAFSWPYPHEXKX-UHFFFAOYSA-N

Carteolol is a non-selective beta blocker used to treat glaucoma. It is administered in the form of eye drops.

Carteolol was patented in 1972 and approved for medical use in 1980.

== Pharmacology ==
=== Pharmacodynamics ===
Carteolol is a beta blocker, or an antagonist of the β-adrenergic receptors. It is selective for the β_{1}-adrenergic receptor and has intrinsic sympathomimetic activity. Carteolol has also been found to act as a serotonin 5-HT_{1A} and 5-HT_{1B} receptor antagonist in addition to being a beta blocker.

=== Pharmacokinetics ===
Carteolol is classified as a beta blocker with low lipophilicity and hence lower potential for crossing the blood–brain barrier. This in turn may result in fewer effects in the central nervous system as well as a lower risk of neuropsychiatric side effects.

== Chemistry ==
The experimental log P of carteolol is 1.1 and its predicted log P ranges from 0.99 to 2.39. It is a hydrophilic or low-lipophilicity beta blocker.

== Society and culture ==
=== Brand names ===
Brand names of carteolol include Arteolol, Arteoptic, Calte, Cartéabak, Carteol, Cartéol, Cartrol, Elebloc, Endak, Glauteolol, Mikelan, Ocupress, Poenglaucol, Singlauc, and Teoptic.
