= Raymond P. Ahlquist =

American pharmacist and pharmacologist (1914–1983)

Raymond Perry Ahlquist
- Courtesy of the National Library of Medicine.
- Born: 26 July 1914; Missoula, Montana, United States
- Died: 15 April 1983 (aged 68); Augusta, Georgia
- Education: University of Washington
- Known for: Discovery of adrenoceptor subtypes
- Awards: Lasker award (1976)
- Scientific career
- Fields: Pharmacology
- Workplaces: Medical College of Georgia

Raymond Perry Ahlquist (July 26, 1914 – April 15, 1983) was an American pharmacist and pharmacologist. He published seminal work in 1948 that divided adrenoceptors into α- and β-adrenoceptor subtypes. This discovery explained the activity of several existing drugs and also laid the groundwork for new drugs including the widely prescribed beta blockers.

== Early life and education ==
Ahlquist was born on July 26, 1914, in Missoula, Montana. Both of his parents came from Sweden. His father was an auditor at the railway company Northern Pacific Railway. In 1940, Ahlquist graduated with a Ph.D. degree in pharmacology from the University of Washington in Seattle, the first person to be awarded such a degree from that institution.

== Career and research ==
Ahlquist spent four years as a faculty member at South Dakota State University in Brookings. In 1944 he became assistant professor of pharmacology at the Medical College of Georgia in Augusta. In 1946 he was appointed associate professor in the same institution and from 1948 to 1963 he was the chair of pharmacology. In 1963 he was appointed associate dean for basic sciences and research coordinator for the medical college. Between 1970 and 1977 he was again chair of pharmacology and in 1977 he was appointed Charbonnier Professor of Pharmacology, a post he held until his death.

=== Adrenoceptors ===
While working on a project in western South Dakota, Ahlquist searched for a substitute for the Chinese plant-derived and scarce ephedrine. It has similar activity to that of adrenaline and noradrenaline - a sympathomimetic, i.e. a substance that stimulates the sympathetic nervous system. The actions of the sympathomimetics confused pharmacologists and physiologists at the time as they could not explain how a single agent could have both excitatory and inhibitory effects.

In his famous work Ahlquist chose six agonists, including epinephrine, norepinephrine, α-methyl noradrenaline and isoprenaline, and examined their effects on several organs, including blood vessels and the heart. He found that the six substances possessed different rank orders of potency that differed depending on the tissue. For example, the rank order of potency was "adrenaline > noradrenaline > α-methyl noradrenaline > isoprenaline" in promoting contraction of blood vessels, but the rank order was "isoprenaline > adrenaline > α-methyl noradrenaline > norepinephrine" in the heart. Ahlquist concluded that there were two different receptors. The receptors with the first rank order (that is, for example, for blood vessel contraction), he called α-adrenoceptors (alpha adrenotropic receptor) receptors, while the second rank order (for instance, for the promotion of cardiac activity), he called β-adrenoceptors.

Simultaneously both cautious and forward-looking, he wrote: "Although little can be said at the present time as to the fundamental nature of the adrenotropic receptor and the difference between the alpha and beta types, this concept should be useful when studying the various actions of epinephrine, the actions and interactions of the sympathomimetic agents, and the effects of sympathetic nerve stimulation."

Ahlquist's classification was initially dismissed and took some time to be accepted, but it went on to have a major impact on pharmacology. The manuscript was first rejected by the Journal of Pharmacology and Experimental Therapeutics, but was subsequently accepted for publication by the American Journal of Physiology. As for Ahlquist's inquiry into the nature of adrenoceptors, we now know that they are G protein-coupled receptors and humans possess a total of nine different adrenoceptors (α1A, α1B, α1D, α2A, α2B α2C, β1, β2, β3). In the field of therapeutics, his discovery laid the foundation for the development of beta blockers by Sir James Black to treat heart disease and reduce high blood pressure.

=== Other work ===
Ahlquist's other scientific work also included studies on the pharmacology of the sympathetic nervous system. His research contributed to the discovery of tolazoline, a non-selective α-adrenergic receptor antagonist with a completely different chemical structure from adrenaline and noradrenaline and in 1958, dichloroisoprenaline, the first beta-blocker. He also contributed to the discovery that peristalsis is enhanced by α-adrenoceptors and inhibited by β-adrenoceptors.

In his last published article in 1980, he looked back to the 1948 publication. The impact of the 1948 publication is evident by the number of times it has been cited (5,220 times as of 28-01-2025).

== Awards ==
Ahlquist was awarded the Oscar B. Hunter Memorial Award in Therapeutics, the Ciba Award for Hypertension Research and the Albert Lasker Award for Clinical Medical Research.

== Personal ==
Ahlquist met his wife Dorothy Duff Ahlquist in Seattle.

== Death ==
Ahlquist died on April 15, 1983, in Augusta, Georgia
