= Beta blocker =

Medication class with multiple uses

Beta blockers
- Drug class
- Skeletal formula of propranolol, the first clinically successful beta blocker.

Class identifiers
- Synonyms: Beta-blockers, β-blockers, beta-adrenergic blocking agents, beta antagonists, beta-adrenergic antagonists, beta-adrenoreceptor antagonists, beta adrenergic receptor antagonists, BB
- Use: Hypertension, arrhythmia, etc.
- ATC code: C07
- Biological target: beta receptors

Clinical data
- Drugs.com: Drug Classes
- Consumer Reports: Best Buy Drugs
- WebMD: MedicineNet RxList

External links
- MeSH: D000319

Legal status

Beta blockers, also spelled β-blockers and also sometimes known as β-adrenergic receptor antagonists, are a class of medications predominantly used to manage abnormal heart rhythms (arrhythmia) and to protect the heart from a second heart attack after the first one (secondary prevention). They are also used widely to treat high blood pressure, though they are no longer the first choice for initial treatment of most people. They can also be used to treat anxiety – a notable example being the situational use of propranolol to help dampen the physical symptoms of performance anxiety.

Beta blockers are competitive antagonists that block the receptor sites for the endogenous catecholamines epinephrine (adrenaline) and norepinephrine (noradrenaline) on adrenergic beta receptors, of the sympathetic nervous system, which mediates the fight-or-flight response.

β-adrenergic receptors are found on cells of the heart muscles, smooth muscles, airways, arteries, kidneys, and other tissues that are part of the sympathetic nervous system and lead to stress responses, especially when they are stimulated by epinephrine (adrenaline). Beta blockers interfere with the binding to the receptor of epinephrine and other stress hormones and thereby weaken the effects of stress hormones.

Some beta blockers block activation of all types of β-adrenergic receptors and others are selective for one of the three known types of beta receptors, designated β_{1}, β_{2}, and β_{3} receptors. β_{1}-Adrenergic receptors are located mainly in the heart and in the kidneys. β_{2}-Adrenergic receptors are located mainly in the lungs, gastrointestinal tract, liver, uterus, vascular smooth muscle, and skeletal muscle. β_{3}-Adrenergic receptors are located in fat cells.

In 1964, James Black synthesized the first clinically significant beta blockers—propranolol and pronethalol; these revolutionized the medical management of angina pectoris and are considered by many to be one of the most important contributions to clinical medicine and pharmacology of the 20th century.

For the treatment of primary hypertension (high blood pressure), meta-analyses of studies which mostly used atenolol have shown that although beta blockers are more effective than placebo in preventing stroke and total cardiovascular events, they are not as effective as diuretics, medications inhibiting the renin–angiotensin system (e.g., ACE inhibitors), or calcium channel blockers.

== Medical uses ==
Beta blockers are utilized in the treatment of various conditions related to the heart and vascular system, as well as several other medical conditions. Common heart-related conditions for which beta blockers are well-established include angina pectoris, acute coronary syndromes, hypertension, and arrhythmias such as atrial fibrillation and heart failure. They are also used in the management of other heart diseases, such as hypertrophic obstructive cardiomyopathy, mitral valve stenosis or prolapse, and dissecting aneurysm. Additionally, beta blockers find applications in vascular surgery, the treatment of anxiety states, cases of thyrotoxicosis, glaucoma, migraines, and esophageal varices.

=== Congestive heart failure ===
Although beta blockers were once contraindicated in congestive heart failure, as they have the potential to worsen the condition due to their effect of decreasing cardiac contractility, studies in the late 1990s showed their efficacy at reducing morbidity and mortality. Bisoprolol, carvedilol, and sustained-release metoprolol are specifically indicated as adjuncts to standard ACE inhibitor and diuretic therapy in congestive heart failure, although at doses typically much lower than those indicated for other conditions. Beta blockers are only indicated in cases of compensated, stable congestive heart failure; in cases of acute decompensated heart failure, beta blockers will cause a further decrease in ejection fraction, worsening the patient's current symptoms.

Beta blockers are known primarily for their reductive effect on heart rate, although this is not the only mechanism of action of importance in congestive heart failure. Beta blockers, in addition to their sympatholytic β_{1} activity in the heart, influence the renin–angiotensin system at the kidneys. Beta blockers cause a decrease in renin secretion, which in turn reduces the heart oxygen demand by lowering the extracellular volume and increasing the oxygen-carrying capacity of the blood. Heart failure characteristically involves increased catecholamine activity on the heart, which is responsible for several deleterious effects, including increased oxygen demand, propagation of inflammatory mediators, and abnormal cardiac tissue remodeling, all of which decrease the efficiency of cardiac contraction and contribute to the low ejection fraction. Beta blockers counter this inappropriately high sympathetic activity, eventually leading to an improved ejection fraction, despite an initial reduction in ejection fraction.

Trials have shown beta blockers reduce the absolute risk of death by 4.5% over a 13-month period. In addition to reducing the risk of mortality, the numbers of hospital visits and hospitalizations were also reduced in the trials. A 2020 Cochrane review found minimal evidence to support the use of beta blockers in congestive heart failure in children, however did identify that from the data available, that they may be of benefit.

Therapeutic administration of beta blockers for congestive heart failure ought to begin at very low doses (1/8 of target) with a gradual escalation of the dose. The heart must adjust to decreasing stimulation by catecholamines and find a new equilibrium at a lower adrenergic drive.

==== Acute myocardial infarction ====
Beta blockers are indicated for the treatment of acute myocardial infarctions. During a myocardial infarction, systemic stress causes an increase in circulating catecholamines. This results an increase in heart rate and blood pressure, therefore increasing myocardial oxygen demand. Beta blockers competitively inhibit catecholamines acting on the β_{1}-adrenergic receptors, thus reducing these detrimental effects and resulting in reduced myocardial oxygen consumption and demand.

A 2019 Cochrane review compared beta blockers with placebo or no intervention, it found that beta blockers probably reduced the short-term risk of reinfarction and the long-term risk of all-cause mortality and cardiovascular mortality. The review identified that beta blockers likely had little to no impact on short-term all-cause mortality and cardiovascular mortality.

=== Hypertension ===
Beta blockers are widely used for the treatment of hypertension.

A 2014 Cochrane review found that in individuals with mild-to-moderate hypertension, non-selective beta blockers led to a reduction of 10/7 mmHg (systolic/diastolic) without increased rates of adverse events. At higher doses, it was found to increase the rate of adverse effects such as a reduction in heart rate, without a corresponding reduction in blood pressure.

A 2017 Cochrane review on the use of beta blockers in hypertension found a modest reduction in cardiovascular disease but little to no change in mortality. It suggested that the effects of beta blockers are inferior to other anti-hypertensive medications.

=== Anxiety ===
Beta blockers are used to treat anxiety disorders including performance anxiety, panic disorder, generalized anxiety disorder, and specific phobias. They are not formally approved for anxiolytic use by the United States Food and Drug Administration. However, many clinical studies have found beta blockers to be effective for anxiety, though the exact mechanism of action is unclear. A 2025 systematic review and meta-analysis found widespread prescription of beta blockers, namely propranolol, for the treatment of anxiety disorders, but found no evidence of a beneficial effect relative to placebo or benzodiazepines in people with social phobia or panic disorder. However, the quality of evidence, including both numbers of studies and patients as well as quality and risk of bias of those studies, was limited. Findings were similar in a previous 2016 systematic review and meta-analysis. Beta blockers that have been used to treat anxiety include propranolol, atenolol, pindolol, nadolol, betaxolol, and oxprenolol.

It is thought that beta blockers do not directly treat psychological symptoms of anxiety, but can help control physical symptoms such as palpitations, and this may interfere with a positive feedback loop to indirectly reduce psychological anxiety. Highly lipophilic beta blockers like propranolol, which are centrally permeable, and highly hydrophilic beta blockers like atenolol, which are peripherally selective, appear to have similar benefits on performance anxiety, suggesting that their anxiolytic effects are mediated peripherally. However, there has been little in the way of direct comparisons between different types of beta blockers. In any case, the physiological symptoms of the fight-or-flight response (pounding heart, cold/clammy hands, increased respiration, sweating, etc.) are significantly reduced, thus enabling anxious individuals to concentrate on the task at hand. Although it is thought that beta blockers may act via peripheral mechanisms, there are also findings from preclinical research of central β-adrenergic receptors mediating anxiety.

Musicians, public speakers, actors, models and adult performers, athletes, and professional dancers have been known to use beta blockers to avoid performance anxiety, stage fright, and tremor during both auditions and public performances. The application to stage fright was first recognized in The Lancet in 1976, and by 1987, a survey conducted by the International Conference of Symphony Orchestra Musicians, representing the 51 largest orchestras in the United States, revealed 27% of its musicians had used beta blockers and 70% obtained them from friends, not physicians. Beta blockers are inexpensive, said to be relatively safe, and on one hand, seem to improve musicians' performances on a technical level, while some, such as Barry Green, the author of The Inner Game of Music and Don Greene, a former Olympic diving coach who teaches Juilliard students to overcome their stage fright naturally, say the performances may be perceived as "soulless and inauthentic". Although beta blockers have been studied and found to improve performance anxiety in musicians, no data exist on treatment of performance anxiety in dancers.

=== Surgery ===
Low certainty evidence indicates that the use of beta blockers around the time of cardiac surgery may decrease the risk of heart dysrhythmias and atrial fibrillation. Starting them around the time of other types of surgery, however, may worsen outcomes. For non-cardiac surgery, the use of beta blockers to prevent adverse effects may reduce the risk of atrial fibrillation and myocardial infarctions (very low certainty evidence), however, there is moderate certainty evidence that this approach may increase the risk of hypotension. Low-certainty evidence suggests that beta blockers used perioperatively in non-cardiac surgeries may increase the risk of bradycardia.

=== Other uses ===
Beta blockers like propranolol may be useful in the treatment of aggression and agitation in contexts like people with schizophrenia or psychosis, brain injuries, and intellectual disabilities.

Beta blockers are frequently used to treat akathisia and may be considered a first-line therapy for this indication. Akathisia is a type of extrapyramidal symptom often associated with antipsychotics used to treat psychotic disorders like schizophrenia. Propranolol is the most-studied beta blocker for treatment of akathisia, whereas very limited data suggest that metoprolol may provide comparable benefits, and nadolol, which is peripherally selective, does not appear to be effective.

Adrenergic antagonists are mostly used for cardiovascular disease. The adrenergic antagonists are widely used for lowering blood pressure and relieving hypertension. These antagonists have been proven to relieve the pain caused by myocardial infarction, and also the infarction size, which correlates with heart rate.

Beta blockers are used to treat acute cardiovascular toxicity (e.g. in overdose) caused by sympathomimetics, for instance caused by amphetamine, methamphetamine, cocaine, ephedrine, and other drugs. Combined α_{1} and beta blockers like labetalol and carvedilol may be more favorable for such purposes due to the possibility of "unopposed α-stimulation" with selective beta blockers like propranolol and atenolol.

Certain beta blockers, particularly oral propranolol and carvedilol as well as topical formulations of timolol and propranolol, are used in the treatment of rosacea, a disease that causes cosmetic redness of certain areas of the face.

==== Aortic disease ====
A 2014 Cochrane review investigated the use of beta blockers in the maintenance of chronic type B thoracic aortic aneurysm in comparison to other anti hypertensive medications. The review found no suitable evidence to support the current guidelines recommending its use.

A 2017 Cochrane review on the use of beta blockers to prevent aortic dissections in people with Marfan syndrome was unable to draw definitive conclusions due to lack of evidence.

=== Indication differences ===
- Agents specifically labeled for cardiac arrhythmia
  - Esmolol, sotalol, landiolol (Japan)
- Agents specifically labeled for congestive heart failure
  - Bisoprolol, carvedilol, sustained-release metoprolol
- Agents specifically labeled for glaucoma
  - Betaxolol, carteolol, levobunolol, timolol, metipranolol
- Agents specifically labeled for myocardial infarction
  - Atenolol, metoprolol (immediate release), propranolol (immediate release), timolol, carvedilol (after left ventricular dysfunction), bisoprolol (preventive treatment before and primary treatment after heart attacks)
- Agents specifically labeled for migraine prophylaxis
  - Timolol, propranolol

Propranolol is the only agent indicated for the control of tremor, portal hypertension, and esophageal variceal bleeding, and used in conjunction with α-blocker therapy in phaeochromocytoma.

== Contraindications ==
Contraindications of beta blockers include the following:

Absolute contraindications:
- Bradycardia
- Hypotension
- Hypersensitivity to beta blockers
- Cardiogenic shock
- Second or third degree AV block

Relative contraindications, or contraindications specific to certain beta-blockers:

- Long QT syndrome: sotalol is contraindicated
- History of torsades de pointes: sotalol is contraindicated

Cautions:

- Abrupt discontinuations
- Acute bronchospasm
- Acute heart failure
- Asthma: see below
- Bronchitis
- Cerebrovascular disease
- Chronic obstructive pulmonary disease (COPD)
- Emphysema
- Kidney failure
- Hepatic disease
- Myopathy
- Pheochromocytoma
- Psoriasis
- Raynaud phenomenon
- Stroke
- Vasospastic angina
- Wolff–Parkinson–White syndrome

Contrast agents are not contraindicated in those receiving beta blockers.

=== Asthma ===
The 2007 National Heart, Lung, and Blood Institute (NHLBI) asthma guidelines recommend against the use of non-selective beta blockers in asthmatics, while allowing for the use of cardio selective beta blockers.

Cardio selective beta blocker (β_{1} blockers) can be prescribed at the least possible dose to those with mild to moderate respiratory symptoms. β2-agonists can somewhat mitigate β-blocker-induced bronchospasm where it exerts greater efficacy on reversing selective β-blocker-induced bronchospasm than the nonselective β-blocker-induced worsening asthma and/or COPD.

=== Diabetes mellitus ===
Epinephrine signals early warning of the upcoming hypoglycemia.

Beta blockers' inhibition on epinephrine's effect can somewhat exacerbate hypoglycemia by interfering with glycogenolysis and mask signs of hypoglycemia such as tachycardia, palpitations, diaphoresis, and tremors. Diligent blood glucose level monitoring is necessary for a patient with diabetes mellitus on beta blockers.

=== Hyperthyroidism ===
Abrupt withdrawal can result in a thyroid storm.

=== Bradycardia or AV block ===
Unless a pacemaker is present, beta blockers can severely depress conduction in the AV node, resulting in a reduction of heart rate and cardiac output. One should be very cautious with the use of beta blockers in tachycardia patients with Wolff-Parkinson-White Syndrome, as it can result in life-threatening arrhythmia in certain patients. By slowing the conduction through the AV node, preferential conduction through the accessory pathway is favored. If the patient happens to develop atrial flutter, this could lead to a 1:1 conduction with very fast ventricular rate, or worse, ventricular fibrillation in the case of atrial fibrillation.

== Adverse effects ==
Adverse drug reactions associated with the use of beta blockers include nausea, diarrhea, bronchospasm, dyspnea, cold extremities, exacerbation of Raynaud's syndrome, bradycardia, hypotension, heart failure, heart block, fatigue, dizziness, alopecia (hair loss), abnormal vision, hallucinations, insomnia, nightmares, sexual dysfunction, erectile dysfunction, alteration of glucose and lipid metabolism. Mixed α_{1}/β-antagonist therapy is also commonly associated with orthostatic hypotension.

Carvedilol therapy is commonly associated with edema. Due to the high penetration across the blood–brain barrier, lipophilic beta blockers, such as propranolol and metoprolol, are more likely than other less lipophilic beta blockers to cause sleep disturbances, such as insomnia, vivid dreams and nightmares.

Adverse effects associated with β_{2}-adrenergic receptor antagonist activity (bronchospasm, peripheral vasoconstriction, alteration of glucose and lipid metabolism) are less common with β_{1}-selective (often termed "cardioselective") agents, but receptor selectivity diminishes at higher doses. Beta blockade, especially of the beta-1 receptor at the macula densa, inhibits renin release, thus decreasing the release of aldosterone. This causes hyponatremia and hyperkalemia.

Hypoglycemia can occur with beta blockade because β_{2}-adrenoceptors normally stimulate glycogen breakdown (glycogenolysis) in the liver and pancreatic release of the hormone glucagon, which work together to increase plasma glucose. Therefore, blocking β_{2}-adrenoceptors lowers plasma glucose. β_{1}-blockers have fewer metabolic side effects in diabetic patients; however, the fast heart rate that serves as a warning sign for insulin-induced low blood sugar may be masked, resulting in hypoglycemia unawareness. This is termed beta blocker-induced hypoglycemia unawareness. Therefore, beta blockers are to be used cautiously in diabetics.

A 2007 study revealed diuretics and beta blockers used for hypertension increase a patient's risk of developing diabetes mellitus, while ACE inhibitors and angiotensin II receptor antagonists (angiotensin receptor blockers) actually decrease the risk of diabetes. Clinical guidelines in Great Britain, but not in the United States, call for avoiding diuretics and beta blockers as first-line treatment of hypertension due to the risk of diabetes.

Beta blockers must not be used in the treatment of selective alpha-adrenergic agonist overdose. The blockade of only beta receptors increases blood pressure, reduces coronary blood flow, left ventricular function, and cardiac output and tissue perfusion by means of leaving the alpha-adrenergic system stimulation unopposed. Beta blockers with lipophilic properties and CNS penetration such as metoprolol and labetalol may be useful for treating CNS and cardiovascular toxicity from a methamphetamine overdose. The mixed alpha- and beta blocker labetalol is especially useful for treatment of concomitant tachycardia and hypertension induced by methamphetamine. The phenomenon of "unopposed alpha stimulation" has not been reported with the use of beta blockers for treatment of methamphetamine toxicity. Other appropriate antihypertensive drugs to administer during hypertensive crisis resulting from stimulant overdose are vasodilators such as nitroglycerin, diuretics such as furosemide, and alpha blockers such as phentolamine.

Beta blockers were found to be associated with depression in earlier studies. More lipophilic beta blockers, with greater central effects, were especially implicated. However, subsequent more rigorous studies found no causal relationship of beta blockers with depression and regardless of lipid solubility. A small and significant but inconsistent risk of fatigue was found for non-selective beta blockers however.

Beta blockers, due to their antagonism at β_{1} adrenergic receptors, inhibit both the synthesis of new melatonin and its secretion by the pineal gland. More lipophilic beta blockers, with greater ability to cross the blood–brain barrier, are known to be able to suppress melatonin release by 50 to 80%. The neuropsychiatric side effects of some beta blockers (e.g. sleep disruption, insomnia) may be related to this effect.

== Overdose ==
Glucagon, used in the treatment of overdose, increases the strength of heart contractions, increases intracellular cAMP, and decreases renal vascular resistance. It is, therefore, useful in patients with beta blocker cardiotoxicity. Cardiac pacing is usually reserved for patients unresponsive to pharmacological therapy.

People experiencing bronchospasm due to the β_{2} receptor-blocking effects of nonselective beta blockers may be treated with anticholinergic drugs, such as ipratropium, which are safer than beta agonists in patients with cardiovascular disease. Other antidotes for beta blocker poisoning are salbutamol and isoprenaline.

== Interactions ==
Beta blockers have a variety of drug interactions. An example is that various beta blockers including propranolol, carvedilol, nebivolol, timolol, and metoprolol are metabolized by the cytochrome P450 enzyme CYP2D6 and may be potentiated by CYP2D6 inhibitors like fluoxetine, paroxetine, duloxetine, and bupropion. This may increase the risk of adverse effects like bradycardia and hypotension.

== Pharmacology ==
Comparison of pharmacological properties of beta blockers
Beta blocker	Selectivity	Lipophilicity (log P)	ISA	MSA
Acebutolol	β_{1}	1–3	Yes/mild	?
Atenolol	β_{1}	<1	No	No
Betaxolol	β_{1}	1–3	Yes	?
Bisoprolol	β_{1}	1–3	No	No
Carteolol	β_{1}, β_{2}	<1	Yes	?
Carvedilol	β_{1}, β_{2}, α_{1}	>3	No	Yes/high
Esmolol	β_{1}	1–3	No	No
Labetalol	β_{1}, β_{2}, α_{1}	>1 (Note: Labetalol appears to be peripherally selective.)	Yes	Yes
Metoprolol	β_{1}	1–3	No	Yes
Nadolol	β_{1}, β_{2}	<1	No	?
Nebivolol	β_{1}	>3	No	?
Oxprenolol	β_{1}, β_{2}	1–3	Yes	Yes
Penbutolol	β_{1}, β_{2}	>3	Yes	?
Pindolol	β_{1}, β_{2}	1–3	Yes/mild	?
Practolol	β_{1}	<1	Yes	No
Propranolol	β_{1}, β_{2}	>3	No	Yes/high
Sotalol	β_{1}, β_{2}	<1	No	No
Timolol	β_{1}, β_{2}	1–3	No	Yes
Refs:

Beta blockers act as β-adrenergic receptor antagonists. They may be non-selective, antagonizing both the β_{1}- and β_{2}-adrenergic receptors, or they may be selective for antagonism of the β_{1}-adrenergic receptor (often referred to as "cardioselective"). Some beta blockers have intrinsic sympathomimetic activity (ISA), otherwise known as partial agonist activity at the β-adrenergic receptors with weak sympathomimetic effects.

Some beta blockers are not selective for the β-adrenergic receptor and have additional α_{1}-adrenergic receptor antagonism. Some beta blockers have membrane-stabilizing activity, otherwise known as sodium channel blockade or local anesthetic activity. Beta blockers vary in their lipophilicity versus hydrophilicity and hence in their capacity to cross the blood–brain barrier, with some having central nervous system effects and others being peripherally selective.

=== β-Adrenergic receptor antagonism ===
Stimulation of β_{1} receptors by epinephrine and norepinephrine induces a positive chronotropic and inotropic effect on the heart and increases cardiac conduction velocity and automaticity. Stimulation of β_{1} receptors on the kidney causes renin release. Stimulation of β_{2} receptors induces smooth muscle relaxation, induces tremor in skeletal muscle, and increases glycogenolysis in the liver and skeletal muscle. Stimulation of β_{3} receptors induces lipolysis.

Beta blockers inhibit these normal epinephrine- and norepinephrine-mediated sympathetic actions, but have minimal effect on resting subjects. That is, they reduce the effect of excitement or physical exertion on heart rate and force of contraction, and also tremor, and breakdown of glycogen. Beta blockers can have a constricting effect on the bronchi of the lungs, possibly worsening or causing asthma symptoms.

Since β_{2} adrenergic receptors can cause vascular smooth muscle dilation, beta blockers may cause some vasoconstriction. However, this effect tends to be small because the activity of β_{2} receptors is overshadowed by the more dominant vasoconstricting α_{1} receptors. By far the greatest effect of beta blockers remains in the heart. Newer, third-generation beta blockers can cause vasodilation through blockade of alpha-adrenergic receptors.

Accordingly, nonselective beta blockers are expected to have antihypertensive effects. The primary antihypertensive mechanism of beta blockers is unclear, but may involve reduction in cardiac output (due to negative chronotropic and inotropic effects). It may also be due to reduction in renin release from the kidneys, and a central nervous system effect to reduce sympathetic activity (for those beta blockers that do cross the blood–brain barrier, e.g. propranolol).

Antianginal effects result from negative chronotropic and inotropic effects, which decrease cardiac workload and oxygen demand. Negative chronotropic properties of beta blockers allow the lifesaving property of heart rate control. Beta blockers are readily titrated to optimal rate control in many pathologic states.

The antiarrhythmic effects of beta blockers arise from sympathetic nervous system blockade—resulting in depression of sinus node function and atrioventricular node conduction, and prolonged atrial refractory periods. Sotalol, in particular, has additional antiarrhythmic properties and prolongs action potential duration through potassium channel blockade.

Blockade of the sympathetic nervous system on renin release leads to reduced aldosterone via the renin–angiotensin–aldosterone system, with a resultant decrease in blood pressure due to decreased sodium and water retention.

=== α_{1}-Adrenergic receptor antagonism ===
Some beta blockers (e.g., labetalol and carvedilol) exhibit mixed antagonism of both β- and α_{1}-adrenergic receptors, which provides additional arteriolar vasodilating action.

=== Intrinsic sympathomimetic activity ===
Also referred to as intrinsic sympathomimetic effect, this term is used particularly with beta blockers that can show both agonism and antagonism at a given beta receptor, depending on the concentration of the agent (beta blocker) and the concentration of the antagonized agent (usually an endogenous compound, such as norepinephrine). See partial agonist for a more general description.

Some beta blockers (e.g. oxprenolol, pindolol, penbutolol, labetalol and acebutolol) exhibit intrinsic sympathomimetic activity (ISA). These agents are capable of exerting low-level agonist activity at the β-adrenergic receptor while simultaneously acting as a receptor site antagonist. These agents, therefore, may be useful in individuals exhibiting excessive bradycardia with sustained beta blocker therapy.

Agents with ISA should not be used for patients with any kind of angina as it can aggravate or after myocardial infarctions. They may also be less effective than other beta blockers in the management of angina and tachyarrhythmia.

=== Blood–brain barrier permeability ===
Beta blockers vary in their lipophilicity (fat solubility) and in turn in their ability to cross the blood–brain barrier and exert effects in the central nervous system. Beta blockers with greater blood–brain barrier permeability can have both neuropsychiatric therapeutic benefits and side effects, as well as adverse cognitive effects. Central nervous system-related side effects and risks of beta blockers may include fatigue, depression, sleep disorders (namely insomnia) and nightmares, visual hallucinations, delirium, psychosis, Parkinson's disease, and falling. Conversely, central nervous system-related benefits of beta blockers may include prevention and treatment of migraine, essential tremor, akathisia, anxiety, post-traumatic stress disorder, aggression, and obsessive–compulsive disorder.

Most beta blockers are lipophilic and can cross into the brain, but there are a number of exceptions. Highly lipophilic beta blockers include penbutolol, pindolol, propranolol, and timolol, moderately lipophilic beta blockers include acebutolol, betaxolol, bisoprolol, carvedilol, metoprolol, and nebivolol, and low lipophilicity or hydrophilic beta blockers include atenolol, carteolol, esmolol, labetalol, nadolol, and sotalol. It is thought that highly lipophilic beta blockers are able to readily cross into the brain, moderately lipophilic beta blockers are able to cross to a lesser degree, and low lipophilicity or hydrophilic beta blockers are minimally able to cross. The preceding beta blockers also vary in their intrinsic sympathomimetic activity and β_{1}-adrenergic receptor selectivity (or cardioselectivity), resulting in further differences in pharmacological profiles and suitability in different contexts between them.

The brain-to-blood ratios of certain beta blockers in humans have been characterized and have been found to be 50:1 for oxprenolol, 15:1 to 33:1 for propranolol, 16:1 for alprenolol, 12:1 for metoprolol, and 0.2:1 for atenolol. The blood-to-brain ratios of various other beta blockers, for instance acebutolol, bevantolol, nadolol, pindolol, and timolol, appear to be unknown.

== History ==
Beta blockers development timeline.

The adrenergic receptors were discovered Henry Hallett Dale in 1906 and the α- and β-adrenergic receptors were differentiated by Raymond P. Ahlquist in 1948. In 1967, the β-adrenergic receptors were further differentiated into the β_{1}- and β_{2}-adrenergic receptors by Alonzo M. Lands.

The first beta blocker to be developed was dichloroisoprenaline, based on structural modification of the β-adrenergic receptor agonist isoprenaline (isoproterenol). It was described by C. E. Powell and I. H. Slater in 1958. However, dichloroisoprenaline had significant partial agonism and sympathomimetic activity and hence was not a pure antagonist. James Black and John Stephenson described pronethalol (nethalide; ICI-38,174; Alderlin) as a purely antagonistic beta blocker in 1962. But pronethalol suffered from off-target activity and associated side effects and toxicity. As such, it did not enter widespread use and was soon discontinued.

In 1964, Black and colleagues published on propranolol (ICI-45,520; Inderal), which did not have the problems of earlier beta blockers. It was introduced for medical use under the brand name Inderal the same year and became the first widely used beta blocker. Since the introduction of propranolol, there have been three generations of beta blockers with different pharmacological properties, with numerous beta blockers having been developed and introduced for medical use.

== Society and culture ==
=== Performance-enhancing use ===
Because they promote lower heart rates and reduce tremors, beta blockers have been used in professional sports where high accuracy is required, including archery, shooting, golf and snooker. Beta blockers are banned in some sports by the International Olympic Committee. In the 2008 Summer Olympics, 50-metre pistol silver medalist and 10-metre air pistol bronze medalist Kim Jong-su tested positive for propranolol and was stripped of his medals.

For similar reasons, beta blockers have also been used by surgeons. Classical musicians have commonly used beta blockers since the 1970s to reduce stage fright.

== Research ==
=== Psychiatric disorders ===
Beta blockers have been researched for treatment of a variety of psychiatric disorders besides anxiety disorders. These include depression, mania, acute stress disorder, post-traumatic stress disorder (PTSD), schizophrenia, aggression, and agitation.

Beta blockers have also been used for the treatment of schizoid personality disorder. However, there is limited evidence supporting the efficacy of supplemental beta blocker use in addition to antipsychotic drugs for treating schizophrenia.

=== Cancer treatment ===
Some preclinical and clinical research suggests that some beta blockers may be beneficial for cancer treatment. However, other studies do not show a correlation between cancer survival and beta blocker use. Also, a 2017 meta-analysis failed to show any benefit for the use of beta blockers in breast cancer.

== List of beta blockers ==
Dichloroisoprenaline, the first beta blocker.

=== Nonselective agents ===
Nonselective beta blockers display both β_{1} and β_{2} antagonism.

- Propranolol
- Bucindolol (has additional α_{1}-blocking activity)
- Carteolol
- Carvedilol (has additional α_{1}-blocking activity)
- Labetalol (has intrinsic sympathomimetic activity and additional α_{1}-blocking activity)
- Nadolol
- Oxprenolol (has intrinsic sympathomimetic activity)
- Penbutolol (has intrinsic sympathomimetic activity)
- Pindolol (has intrinsic sympathomimetic activity)
- Sotalol (not considered a "typical beta blocker")
- Timolol

=== β_{1}-selective agents ===
β_{1}-selective beta blockers are also known as cardioselective beta blockers. Pharmacologically, the beta-blockade of the β_{1} receptors in the heart will act on cAMP. The function of cAMP as a second messenger in the cardiac cell is that it phosphorylates the LTCC and the ryanodine receptor to increase intracellular calcium levels and cause contraction. Beta-blockade of the β_{1} receptor will inhibit cAMP from phosphorylating, and it will decrease the ionotrophic and chronotropic effect. Note that drugs may be cardioselective, or act on β_{1} receptors in the heart only, but still have intrinsic sympathomimetic activity.

- Acebutolol (has intrinsic sympathomimetic activity, ISA)
- Atenolol
- Betaxolol
- Bisoprolol
- Celiprolol (has intrinsic sympathomimetic activity)
- Metoprolol
- Nebivolol
- Esmolol

Nebivolol and bisoprolol are the most β_{1} cardioselective beta blockers.

=== β_{2}-selective agents ===
Due to their limited indications, β_{2}-selective agents are rarely used in the clinical setting.

- Butaxamine
- ICI-118,551

=== β_{3}-selective agents ===
- SR 59230A

=== β_{1} selective antagonist and β_{3} agonist agents ===
- Nebivolol

== See also ==
- Adrenergic antagonist
- Adrenergic receptor
- Alpha blocker
- Discovery and development of beta-blockers
- Sympathetic nervous system
