= Acebutolol =

Chemical compound

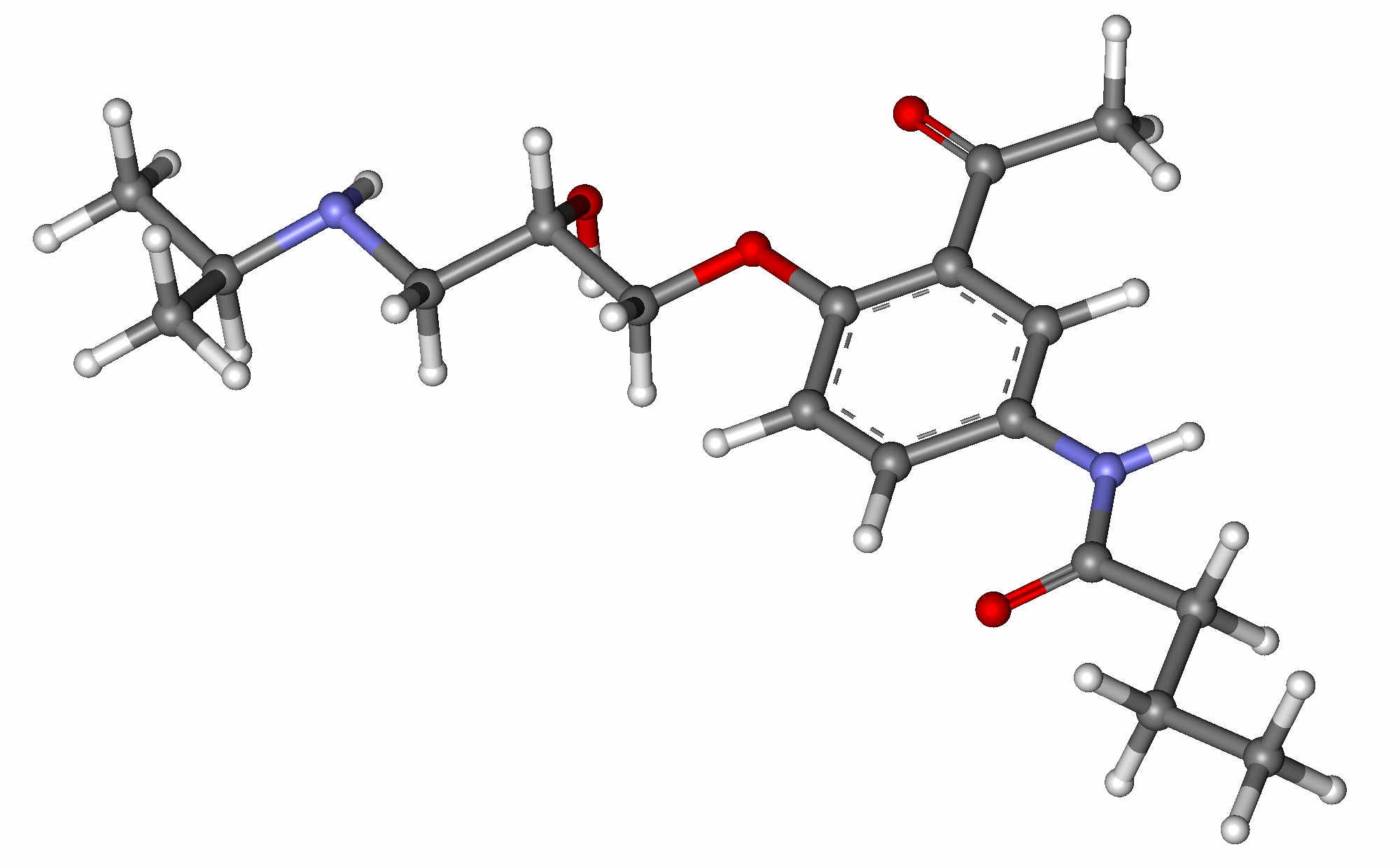

Clinical data
- Trade names: Sectral, Prent, others
- AHFS/Drugs.com: Monograph
- MedlinePlus: a687003
- License data: US FDA: Acebutolol
- Pregnancy category: AU: C
- Routes of administration: By mouth, IV
- ATC code: C07AB04 (WHO)

Legal status
- Legal status: UK: POM (Prescription only); In general: ℞ (Prescription only)

Pharmacokinetic data
- Bioavailability: 40% (range 35 to 50%)
- Metabolism: Hepatic
- Elimination half-life: 3-4 hours (parent drug); 8-13 hours (active metabolite)
- Excretion: Renal: 30% Biliary: 60%

Identifiers
- IUPAC name: (RS)-N-{3-acetyl-4-[2-hydroxy-3-(propan-2-ylamino)propoxy]phenyl}butanamide
- CAS Number: 37517-30-9
- PubChem CID: 1978
- IUPHAR/BPS: 7107
- DrugBank: DB01193
- ChemSpider: 1901
- UNII: 67P356D8GH
- KEGG: D02338
- ChEBI: CHEBI:2379
- ChEMBL: ChEMBL642
- CompTox Dashboard (EPA): DTXSID2048539
- ECHA InfoCard: 100.048.654

Chemical and physical data
- Formula: C_{18}H_{28}N_{2}O_{4}
- Molar mass: 336.432 g·mol^{−1}
- 3D model (JSmol): Interactive image
- Melting point: 121 °C (250 °F)
- SMILES: O=C(Nc1ccc(OCC(O)CNC(C)C)c(c1)C(=O)C)CCC
- InChI: InChI=1S/C18H28N2O4/c1-5-6-18(23)20-14-7-8-17(16(9-14)13(4)21)24-11-15(22)10-19-12(2)3/h7-9,12,15,19,22H,5-6,10-11H2,1-4H3,(H,20,23); Key:GOEMGAFJFRBGGG-UHFFFAOYSA-N

Acebutolol, sold under the brand names Sectral among others, is a beta blocker for the treatment of hypertension and arrhythmias. Acebutolol is a cardioselective beta-1 blocker and has intrinsic sympathetic activity. It is commonly used in the treatment of angina.

It was patented in 1967 and approved for medical use in 1973.

== Medical uses ==
- Hypertension
- Ventricular and atrial cardiac arrhythmia
- Acute myocardial infarction in high-risk patients
- Smith–Magenis syndrome

== Contraindications ==
- Stable or unstable angina (due to its partial agonist or ISA activity)

== Side effects ==
The development of anti-nuclear antibodies (ANA) has been found in 10 to 30% of patients under treatment with acebutolol. A systemic disease with arthralgic pain and myalgias has been observed in 1%. A lupus erythematosus-like syndrome with skin rash and multiforme organ involvement is even less frequent. The incidence of both ANA and symptomatic disease under acebutolol is higher than under propranolol. Female patients are more likely to develop these symptoms than male patients. Some few cases of hepatotoxicity with increased liver enzymes (ALT, AST) have been seen. Altogether, 5 to 6% of all patients treated have to discontinue acebutolol due to intolerable side effects. When possible, the treatment should be discontinued gradually in order to avoid a withdrawal syndrome with increased frequency of angina and even precipitation of myocardial infarction.

== Pharmacology ==
Acebutolol is a cardioselective beta-1 blocker which also considered a partial agonist due to its intrinsic sympathomimetic activity (ISA). This means it provides low-grade beta stimulation at rest but acting as typical beta-blockers when sympathetic activity is high. Among other drugs in the beta-blocker class, Acebutolol will provide beta-blockade effects to a lesser extent. Due to its cardioselectivity, Acebutolol is more suitable than non-cardioselective beta-blockers, in a patient with asthma or chronic obstructive pulmonary disease (COPD) who needs treatment with a beta-blocker. This cardio-specificity will minimize the anti-hypertensive effects as seen with non-specific beta blockers such as Propanalol and Nadolol. (For these reasons, it may be a beta-blocker of choice in inclusion in Polypill strategies). In doses lower than 800 mg daily its constricting effects on the bronchial system and smooth muscle vessels are only 10% to 30% of those observed under propranolol treatment, but there is experimental evidence that the cardioselective properties diminish at doses of 800 mg/day or more.

The drug has lipophilic properties and therefore crosses the blood–brain barrier. Acebutolol has no negative impact on serum lipids (cholesterol and triglycerides). No HDL decrease has been observed. In this regard, it is unlike many other beta-blockers which have this unfavourable property.

The drug works in hypertensive patients with high, normal, or low renin plasma concentrations, although acebutolol may be more efficient in patients with high or normal renin plasma concentrations. In clinically relevant concentrations, a membrane-stabilizing effect does not appear to play an important role.

== Pharmacokinetics ==
Acebutolol is well absorbed from the GI tract, but undergoes substantial first-pass-metabolization, leading to a bioavailability of only 35% to 50%. Peak plasma levels of acebutolol are reached within 2 to 2.5 hours after oral dosing. Peak levels of the main active metabolite, diacetolol, are reached after 4 hours. Acebutolol has a half-life of 3 to 4 hours, and diacetolol a half-life of 8 to 13 hours.

Acebutolol undergoes extensive hepatic metabolization resulting in the desbutyl amine acetolol which is readily converted into diacetolol. Diacetolol is as active as acebutolol (equipotency) and appears to have the same pharmacologic profile. Geriatric patients tend to have higher peak plasma levels of both acebutolol and diacetolol and a slightly prolonged excretion. Excretion is substantially prolonged in patients with renal impairment, and so a dose reduction may be needed. Liver cirrhosis does not seem to alter the pharmacokinetic profile of the parent drug and metabolite.

== Chemistry ==
The experimental and predicted log P of acebutolol are about 1.7.
