= Celiprolol =

Beta blocker drug

Clinical data
- AHFS/Drugs.com: International Drug Names
- ATC code: C07AB08 (WHO)

Pharmacokinetic data
- Bioavailability: 30-70%
- Elimination half-life: 5 hours

Identifiers
- IUPAC name: (RS)-N'-{3-Acetyl-4-[3-(tert-butylamino)-2-hydroxypropoxy]phenyl}-N,N-diethylurea
- CAS Number: 56980-93-9
- PubChem CID: 2663
- DrugBank: DB04846
- ChemSpider: 2563
- UNII: DRB57K47QC
- KEGG: D07660
- ChEMBL: ChEMBL27810
- CompTox Dashboard (EPA): DTXSID3020259
- ECHA InfoCard: 100.054.980

Chemical and physical data
- Formula: C_{20}H_{33}N_{3}O_{4}
- Molar mass: 379.501 g·mol^{−1}
- 3D model (JSmol): Interactive image
- Chirality: Racemic mixture
- SMILES: O=C(N(CC)CC)Nc1ccc(OCC(O)CNC(C)(C)C)c(c1)C(=O)C

Celiprolol is a medication in the class of beta blockers, used in the treatment of high blood pressure. It has a unique pharmacology: it is a selective β1 receptor antagonist, but a β2 receptor partial agonist. It is also a weak α2 receptor antagonist.

It was patented in 1973 and approved for medical use in 1982.

== Medical use ==
Celiprolol is believed to provide clinical benefit for people with vascular Ehlers–Danlos syndrome by promoting normal collagen synthesis in the blood vessels, and by shifting the pressure load away from the vessels most prone to dissection and rupture. In 2019, a new drug application (NDA) for celiprolol was denied by the U.S. Food and Drug Administration (FDA), instead calling for an “adequate and well-controlled” trial to determine whether celiprolol reduced the risk of clinical events in patients with vEDS. In June 2022, Acer Therapeutics Inc. sponsored "Clinical Trial to Compare the Efficacy of Celiprolol to Placebo in Patients With Vascular Ehlers-Danlos Syndrome (DiSCOVER)".

== Brand names ==
Brand names include Cardem, Selectol, Celipres, Celipro, Celol, Cordiax, Dilanorm
