= Dichloroisoprenaline =

Names
- Preferred IUPAC name 1-(3,4-Dichlorophenyl)-2-[(propan-2-yl)amino]ethan-1-ol
- Other names 1-(3,4-Dichlorophenyl)-2-(isopropylamino)ethanol; Dichlorisoproterenol

Identifiers
CAS Number	59-61-0
3D model (JSmol)	Interactive image; Interactive image
ChEBI	CHEBI:144234
ChEMBL	ChEMBL30816
ChemSpider	5601 (1R); 5324297 (1S); 5601 ()
KEGG	C11772
MeSH	Dichloroisoproterenol
PubChem CID	5806 (1R); 6951395 (1S); 5806 ()
UNII	U7NOE2K4M2
CompTox Dashboard (EPA)	DTXSID20874225
- InChI: InChI=1S/C11H15Cl2NO/c1-7(2)14-6-11(15)8-3-4-9(12)10(13)5-8/h3-5,7,11,14-15H,6H2,1-2H3 Key: VKMGSWIFEHZQRS-UHFFFAOYSA-N; InChI=1/C11H15Cl2NO/c1-7(2)14-6-11(15)8-3-4-9(12)10(13)5-8/h3-5,7,11,14-15H,6H2,1-2H3 Key: VKMGSWIFEHZQRS-UHFFFAOYAS
- SMILES: CC(C)NCC(O)C1=CC(Cl)=C(Cl)C=C1; Clc1ccc(cc1Cl)C(O)CNC(C)C

Properties
Chemical formula	C_{11}H_{15}Cl_{2}NO
Molar mass	248.15 g/mol
- Except where otherwise noted, data are given for materials in their standard state (at 25 °C [77 °F], 100 kPa). verify (what is ?) Infobox references

Dichloroisoprenaline (DCI), also known as dichloroisoproterenol, was the first beta blocker ever to be developed. It is non-selective for the β_{1}-adrenergic and β_{2}-adrenergic receptors. DCI has low potency and acts as a partial agonist/antagonist at these receptors.

Although DCI was of no clinical value itself, further developments from DCI eventually led to the development of the clinical candidate pronethalol (withdrawn due to carcinogenicity) and subsequently propranolol (the first clinically successful beta blocker).

Dichloroisoprenaline is a racemic mixture of enantiomers.

The two enantiomers of dichloroisoprenaline
