= Membrane stabilizing effect =

Effects on cell membranes

Membrane stabilizing effects involve the inhibition or total abolishing of action potentials from being propagated across the membrane. This phenomenon is common in nerve tissues as they are the carrier of impulses from the periphery to the central nervous system. Membrane stabilization is the method through which local anesthetics work. They block the propagation of action potentials across nerve cells, thereby producing a nerve block.

Some beta-blockers also possess what is referred to as membrane stabilizing activity (MSA). This effect is similar to the membrane stabilizing activity of sodium channel blockers that represent Class I antiarrhythmics. MSA agents produced by beta-blockers reduce the increase of cardiac action potential, while also leading to other electrophysiological effects. However, MSA occurs only at very high concentrations and is not of clinical relevance, except after large doses of MSA compounds.
