= C15H22N2O2 =

The molecular formula C_{15}H_{22}N_{2}O_{2} may refer to:

- Alprenoxime, a beta blocker and prodrug to alprenolol
- Mepindolol, a non-selective beta blocker used to treat glaucoma
