= Tertatolol =

Chemical compound

Clinical data
- AHFS/Drugs.com: International Drug Names
- Routes of administration: Oral
- ATC code: C07AA16 (WHO)

Legal status
- Legal status: In general: ℞ (Prescription only)

Identifiers
- IUPAC name: (±)-1-(tert-Butylamino)-3-(3,4-dihydro-2H-thiochromen-8-yloxy)propan-2-ol
- CAS Number: 83688-84-0
- PubChem CID: 36920
- IUPHAR/BPS: 571
- ChemSpider: 33875
- UNII: 9ZO341YQXP
- KEGG: D07182
- ChEMBL: ChEMBL434200
- CompTox Dashboard (EPA): DTXSID80865735
- ECHA InfoCard: 100.073.179

Chemical and physical data
- Formula: C_{16}H_{25}NO_{2}S
- Molar mass: 295.44 g·mol^{−1}
- 3D model (JSmol): Interactive image
- Chirality: Racemic mixture
- SMILES: CC(C)(C)NCC(COC1=CC=CC2=C1SCCC2)O
- InChI: InChI=1S/C16H25NO2S/c1-16(2,3)17-10-13(18)11-19-14-8-4-6-12-7-5-9-20-15(12)14/h4,6,8,13,17-18H,5,7,9-11H2,1-3H3; Key:HTWFXPCUFWKXOP-UHFFFAOYSA-N

Tertatolol (Artex, Artexal, Prenalex) is a medication in the class of beta blockers, used in the treatment of high blood pressure. It was discovered by the French pharmaceutical company Servier and is marketed in Europe.

Tertatolol produces unique renal vasodilatory effects, mostly at a microcirculatory level, and inhibits human mesangial cell proliferation. Tertatolol has also been shown to act as a serotonin 5-HT_{1A} and 5-HT_{1B} receptor antagonist, similarly to propranolol and pindolol.

== See also ==
- Hydroxytertatolol
