= Alprenolol =

Chemical compound

Clinical data
- AHFS/Drugs.com: International Drug Names
- Routes of administration: Oral
- ATC code: C07AA01 (WHO)

Pharmacokinetic data
- Protein binding: 80% - 90%
- Elimination half-life: 2-3 hours → 4-OH-alprenolol

Identifiers
- IUPAC name: (RS)-1-(2-allylphenoxy)-3-(isopropylamino)propan-2-ol
- CAS Number: 13655-52-2
- PubChem CID: 2119
- IUPHAR/BPS: 563
- DrugBank: DB00866
- ChemSpider: 2035
- UNII: 877K5MQ27W
- KEGG: D07156
- ChEBI: CHEBI:51211
- ChEMBL: ChEMBL266195
- CompTox Dashboard (EPA): DTXSID0045127
- ECHA InfoCard: 100.033.750

Chemical and physical data
- Formula: C_{15}H_{23}NO_{2}
- Molar mass: 249.354 g·mol^{−1}
- 3D model (JSmol): Interactive image
- SMILES: O(c1ccccc1C\C=C)CC(O)CNC(C)C
- InChI: InChI=1S/C15H23NO2/c1-4-7-13-8-5-6-9-15(13)18-11-14(17)10-16-12(2)3/h4-6,8-9,12,14,16-17H,1,7,10-11H2,2-3H3; Key:PAZJSJFMUHDSTF-UHFFFAOYSA-N

Alprenolol, or alfeprol, alpheprol, and alprenololum (Gubernal, Regletin, Yobir, Apllobal, Aptine, Aptol Duriles), is a non-selective beta blocker as well as a 5-HT_{1A} and 5-HT_{1B} receptor antagonist, used in the treatment of angina pectoris. It is no longer marketed by AstraZeneca, but may still be available from other pharmaceutical companies or generically.

== Pharmacology ==
=== Pharmacokinetics ===
The brain-to-blood ratio of alprenolol in humans has been found to be 16:1. For comparison, the brain-to-blood ratio of the highly lipophilic propranolol was 15:1 to 26:1 and of the hydrophilic atenolol was 0.2:1.
