= Iodopindolol =

Chemical compound

Clinical data
- Other names: [125I]Iodopindolol; 3-Iodopindolol

Identifiers
- IUPAC name: (2S)-1-{[3-(^{125}I)Iodo-1H-indol-4-yl]oxy}-3-(isopropylamino)-2-propanol
- CAS Number: 76875-01-9
- ChemSpider: 110369
- CompTox Dashboard (EPA): DTXSID60998176

Chemical and physical data
- Formula: C_{14}H_{19}IN_{2}O_{2}
- Molar mass: 374.222 g·mol^{−1}
- 3D model (JSmol): Interactive image
- SMILES: CC(C)NC[C@@H](COc1cccc2c1c(c[nH]2)[125I])O
- InChI: InChI=1S/C14H19IN2O2/c1-9(2)16-6-10(18)8-19-13-5-3-4-12-14(13)11(15)7-17-12/h3-5,7,9-10,16-18H,6,8H2,1-2H3/t10-/m0/s1/i15-2; Key:LOMQONAZKMLAOB-BDIJBZSESA-N

Iodopindolol is a beta-adrenergic selective antagonist tagged with radioactive iodine-125. It has been used to map beta receptors in cellular experiments.

== See also ==
- Pindolol
