= Metoprolol =

Beta blocker medication

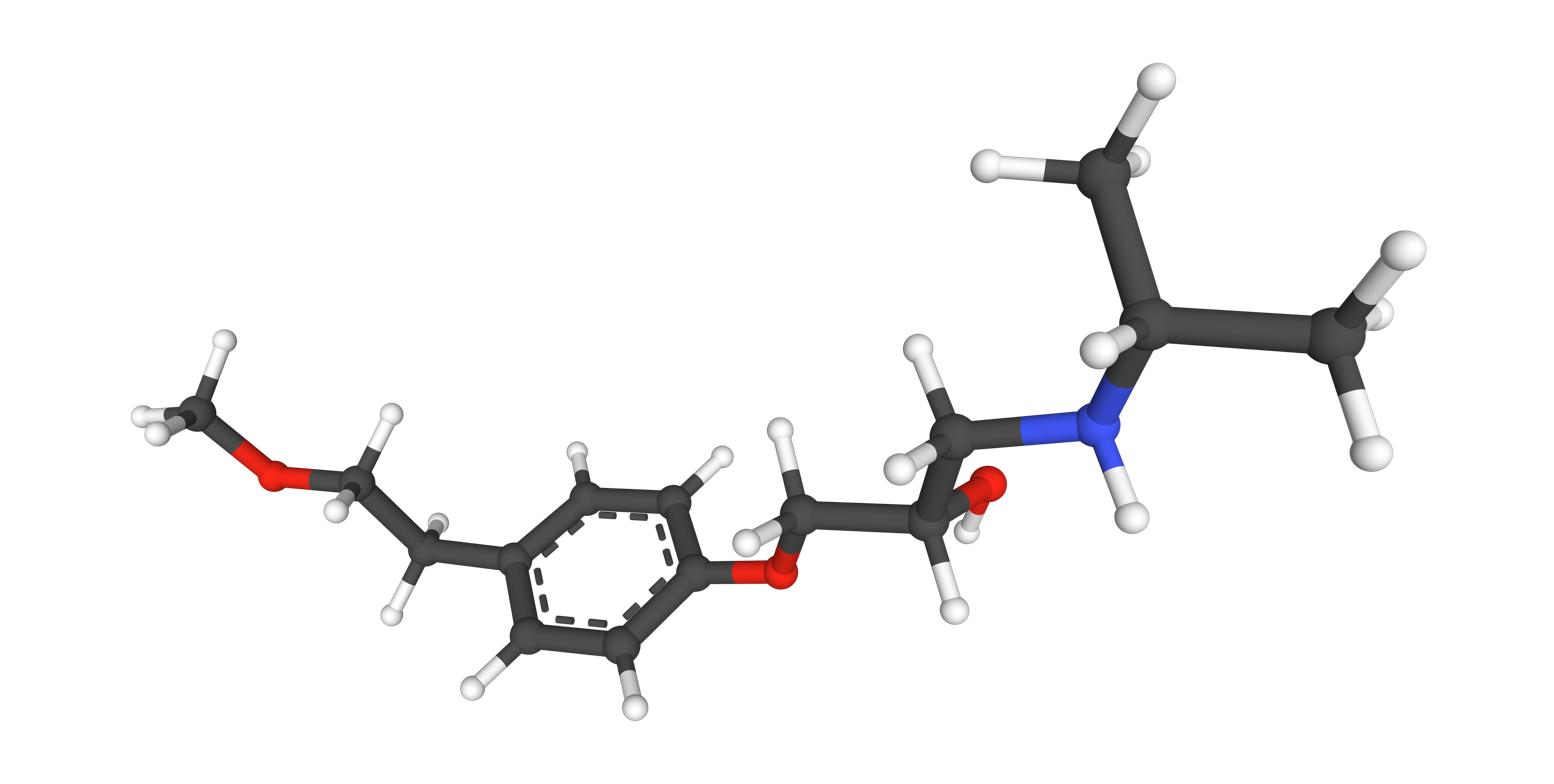

Clinical data
- Pronunciation: /mɛˈtoʊproʊlɑːl/, /mɛtoʊˈproʊlɑːl/
- Trade names: Lopressor (metoprolol tartrate), Toprol-XL (metoprolol succinate)
- AHFS/Drugs.com: Monograph
- MedlinePlus: a682864
- License data: US DailyMed: Metoprolol
- Pregnancy category: AU: C
- Routes of administration: By mouth, intravenous
- Drug class: Beta blocker
- ATC code: C07AB02 (WHO)

Legal status
- Legal status: AU: S4 (Prescription only); CA: ℞-only; UK: POM (Prescription only); US: ℞-only; In general: ℞ (Prescription only)

Pharmacokinetic data
- Bioavailability: 50% (single dose); 70% (repeated administration)
- Protein binding: 12%
- Metabolism: Liver via CYP2D6, CYP3A4
- Elimination half-life: 3–7 hours
- Excretion: Kidney

Identifiers
- IUPAC name: (RS)-1-[4-(2-Methoxyethyl)phenoxy]-3-[(propan-2-yl)amino]propan-2-ol
- CAS Number: 51384-51-1
- PubChem CID: 4171
- IUPHAR/BPS: 553
- DrugBank: DB00264
- ChemSpider: 4027
- UNII: GEB06NHM23
- KEGG: D02358
- ChEBI: CHEBI:6904
- ChEMBL: ChEMBL13
- CompTox Dashboard (EPA): DTXSID2023309
- ECHA InfoCard: 100.051.952

Chemical and physical data
- Formula: C_{15}H_{25}NO_{3}
- Molar mass: 267.369 g·mol^{−1}
- 3D model (JSmol): Interactive image
- Chirality: Racemic mixture
- Melting point: 120 °C (248 °F)
- SMILES: O(c1ccc(cc1)CCOC)CC(O)CNC(C)C
- InChI: InChI=1S/C15H25NO3/c1-12(2)16-10-14(17)11-19-15-6-4-13(5-7-15)8-9-18-3/h4-7,12,14,16-17H,8-11H2,1-3H3; Key:IUBSYMUCCVWXPE-UHFFFAOYSA-N

Metoprolol, sold under the brand names Lopressor and Toprol-XL among others, is a medication used to treat angina, high blood pressure and a number of conditions involving an abnormally fast heart rate. It is also used to prevent further heart problems after myocardial infarction and to prevent headaches in those with migraines. It is a beta blocker, specifically a selective competitive β_{1} receptor blocker, and is taken by mouth or is given intravenously.

Common side effects include trouble sleeping, feeling tired, feeling faint, and abdominal discomfort. Large doses may cause serious toxicity. Risk in pregnancy has not been ruled out. It appears to be safe in breastfeeding. The metabolism of metoprolol can vary widely among patients, often as a result of hepatic impairment or CYP2D6 polymorphism.

Metoprolol was first made in 1969, patented in 1970, and approved for medical use in 1978. It is on the World Health Organization's List of Essential Medicines. It is available as a generic medication. In 2024, it was the eighth most commonly prescribed medication in the United States, with more than 58 million prescriptions.

== Medical uses ==
Metoprolol is used for a number of conditions, including angina, acute myocardial infarction, high blood pressure, supraventricular tachycardia, ventricular tachycardia, congestive heart failure, and prevention of migraine headaches. It is an adjunct in the treatment of hyperthyroidism. Both oral and intravenous forms of metoprolol are available for administration. The different salt versions of metoprolol – metoprolol tartrate (short acting) and metoprolol succinate (long acting) – are significantly different from one another and should not be substituted for one another except when used as directed by a medical professional.

Off-label uses include supraventricular tachycardia and thyroid storm.

== Adverse effects ==
Adverse effects, especially with higher doses, include dizziness, drowsiness, fatigue, diarrhea, unusual dreams, trouble sleeping, depression, and vision problems such as blurred vision or dry eyes. β-blockers, including metoprolol, reduce salivary flow via inhibition of the direct sympathetic innervation of the salivary glands. Metoprolol may also cause the hands and feet to feel cold. Due to the high penetration across the blood–brain barrier, lipophilic beta blockers such as propranolol and metoprolol are more likely than other less lipophilic beta blockers to cause sleep disturbances such as insomnia, vivid dreams and nightmares. Patients should be cautious while driving or operating machinery due to its potential to cause decreased alertness.

There may also be an impact on blood sugar levels, and it can potentially mask signs of low blood sugar.

The safety of metoprolol during pregnancy is not fully established.

=== Precautions ===
Metoprolol succinate controlled release (CR)/extended release (XR) plays an important role in the management of Heart Failure with reduced Ejection Fraction (HFrEF) defined by a left ventricular ejection fraction of ≤ 40%. Evidence supports it reduces the incidence of hospitalisation due to cardiovascular events and worsening heart failure when used in combination with other medications in accordance to current prescribing guidelines. Initiating metoprolol in patients with severe heart failure may cause early clinical deterioration and may not be beneficial in some cases, however, MERIT-HF showed that by approximately two months metoprolol reduces mortality and hospitalisations. COMET suggests early mortality risk is more strongly linked to beta-blocker dose reduction or withdrawal during decompensated heart failure, rather than metoprolol initiation itself.. Patients should monitor for swelling of extremities, fatigue, and shortness of breath.

Given that the evidence from the Cochrane Review there is some efficacy of metoprolol as a prevention of atrial fibrillation recurrence but not prominent. Further investigation may require assessing the ongoing benefit.

This medicine may cause changes in blood sugar levels or cover up signs of low blood sugar, such as a rapid pulse rate. It also may cause some people to become less alert than they are normally, making it dangerous for them to drive or use machines.

=== Pregnancy and breastfeeding ===
Risk for the fetus has not been ruled out, per being rated pregnancy category C in Australia, meaning that it may be suspected of causing harmful effects on the human fetus (but no malformations). It appears to be safe in breastfeeding.

== Overdose ==
Excessive doses of metoprolol can cause bradycardia, hypotension, metabolic acidosis, seizures, and cardiorespiratory arrest. Blood or plasma concentrations may be measured to confirm a diagnosis of overdose or poisoning in hospitalized patients or to assist in a medicolegal death investigation. Plasma levels are usually less than 200 μg/L during therapeutic administration, but can range from 1–20 mg/L in overdose victims.

== Pharmacology ==
=== Mechanism of action ===
Metoprolol is a beta blocker, or an antagonist of the β-adrenergic receptors. It is specifically a selective antagonist of the β_{1}-adrenergic receptor and has no intrinsic sympathomimetic activity.

Metoprolol exerts its effects by blocking the action of certain neurotransmitters, specifically adrenaline and noradrenaline. It does this by selectively binding to and antagonizing β_{1} adrenergic receptors in the body. When adrenaline (epinephrine) or noradrenaline (norepinephrine) are released from nerve endings or secreted by the adrenal glands, they bind to β_{1} adrenergic receptors found primarily in cardiac tissues such as the heart. This binding activates these receptors, leading to various physiological responses, including an increase in heart rate, force of contraction (inotropic effect), conduction speed through electrical pathways in the heart, and release of renin from the kidneys. Metoprolol competes with adrenaline and noradrenaline for binding sites on these β_{1} receptors. By occupying these receptor sites without activating them, metoprolol blocks or inhibits their activation by endogenous catecholamines like adrenaline or noradrenaline.

Metoprolol blocks β_{1}-adrenergic receptors in heart muscle cells, thereby decreasing the slope of phase 4 in the nodal action potential (reducing Na^{+} uptake) and prolonging repolarization of phase 3 (slowing down K^{+} release). It also suppresses the norepinephrine-induced increase in the sarcoplasmic reticulum (SR) Ca^{2+} leak and the spontaneous SR Ca^{2+} release, which are the major triggers for atrial fibrillation.

Through this mechanism of selective blockade at β_{1} receptors, metoprolol exerts the following effects:

1. Heart rate reduction, i.e., decrease of the resting heart rate (negative chronotropic effect) and reduction of excessive elevations resulting from exercise or stress.
2. Reduction of the force of contraction, i.e., decrease in contractility (negative inotropic effect), which lessens how hard each heartbeat contracts.
3. Decrease in cardiac output, i.e., decrease in both heart rate and contractility within myocardium cells, where β_{1} is predominantly located, overall blood output per minute lowers called cardiac output/dysfunction, allowing decreased demands placed onto impaired hearts, reducing oxygen demand-supply mismatch.
4. Lowering of blood pressure.
5. Antiarrhythmic effects, such as supraventricular tachycardia prevention. Metoprolol also prevents electrical wave propagation.

Metoprolol inhibits CYP2J2.

=== Pharmacokinetics ===
Metoprolol is mostly absorbed from the intestine with an absorption fraction of 0.95. The systemic bioavailability after oral administration is approximately 50%. Less than 5% of an orally administered dose of metoprolol is excreted unchanged in urine; most of it is eliminated in metabolized form through feces via bile secretion into the intestines.

Metoprolol binds mainly to human serum albumin with an unbound fraction of 0.88.

The reported volume of distribution of metoprolol is 4.2 L/kg, indicating extensive distribution throughout the body. Metoprolol is classified as a moderately lipophilic beta blocker. More lipophilic beta blockers tend to cross the blood–brain barrier more readily, with greater potential for effects in the central nervous system as well as associated neuropsychiatric side effects. The brain-to-blood ratio of metoprolol in humans has been found to be 12:1. For comparison, the brain-to-blood ratio of the highly lipophilic propranolol was 15:1 to 26:1 and of the hydrophilic atenolol was 0.2:1.

Metoprolol undergoes extensive metabolism in the liver, mainly α-hydroxylation and O-demethylation through various cytochrome P450 enzymes such as CYP2D6 (primary), CYP3A4, CYP2B6, and CYP2C9. The primary metabolites formed are α-hydroxymetoprolol and O-demethylmetoprolol. Its clearance rate on patients with normal kidney function is 0.8 L/min. In cirrhotic patients, the clearance rate is 0.61 L/min

The half-life of metoprolol depends on the type of formulation. The immediate release formulations present a half-life of about 3-7 hours.

=== Pharmacodynamics ===
Metoprolol is a competitive inhibitior of β beta-adrenergic receptor. The affinity for β_{1} receptor gives its selectivity for the heart. It is devoid of intrinsic sympathomimetic activity. Its action results in the reduction of heart rate, cardiac output, and blood pressure, both at rest and during physical exercise. In hypertensive patients, systolic blood pressure is reduced rapidly after administration, while achieving a maximal reduction in diastolic pressure requires several weeks of treatment.

== Chemistry ==
The following table summarizes the main physicochemical properties of metoprolol.

Physical and chemical properties of metoprolol
Property	Value	Unit	Source
Molecular Weight	267.36	g/mol	
logP	1.6 - 2.15	-	.
Melting point	120	°C	
Boiling point	398	°C	
Water Solubility	Soluble	-	
Basic pKa	9.56	-	
Caco2 permeability	-4.59	-	

=== Stereochemistry ===
Metoprolol contains a stereocenter and consists of two enantiomers. This is a racemate, i.e. a 1:1 mixture of (R)- and the (S)-form:

Enantiomers of metoprolol
CAS-Number: 81024-43-3	CAS-Number: 81024-42-2

=== Formulations ===
Metoprolol was synthesized and its activity discovered in 1969. The specific agent in on-market formulations of metoprolol is either metoprolol tartrate or metoprolol succinate, where tartrate is an immediate-release formulation and the succinate is an extended-release formulation (with 100 mg metoprolol tartrate corresponding to 95 mg metoprolol succinate).

Metoprolol tartrate was first developed by Novartis and this dosage form received approval in the US in 1978. The extended-release salt, metoprolol succinate was developed by Astra Pharmaceuticals, and received a US patent in 1992.

== Society and culture ==
=== Legal status ===
Metoprolol was approved for medical use in the United States in August 1978.

=== Economics ===
In the 2000s, a lawsuit was brought against the manufacturers of Toprol XL (a time-release formula version of metoprolol) and its generic equivalent (metoprolol succinate) claiming that to increase profits, lower cost generic versions of Toprol XL were intentionally kept off the market. It alleged that the pharmaceutical companies AstraZeneca AB, AstraZeneca LP, AstraZeneca Pharmaceuticals LP, and Aktiebolaget Hassle violated antitrust and consumer protection law. In a settlement by the companies in 2012, without admission to the claims, they agreed to a settlement pay-out of US$11 million.

=== Sports ===
Because beta blockers can be used to reduce heart rate and minimize tremors, which can enhance performance in sports such as archery, metoprolol is banned by the world anti-doping agency in some sports.
