= Practolol =

Chemical compound

Clinical data
- ATC code: C07AB01 (WHO)

Identifiers
- IUPAC name: (RS)-N-{4-[2-hydroxy-3-(isopropylamino)propoxy]phenyl}acetamide
- CAS Number: 6673-35-4
- PubChem CID: 4883
- IUPHAR/BPS: 555
- DrugBank: DB01297
- ChemSpider: 4715
- UNII: SUG9176GRW
- KEGG: D05587
- ChEBI: CHEBI:258351
- ChEMBL: ChEMBL6995
- CompTox Dashboard (EPA): DTXSID0021179
- ECHA InfoCard: 100.027.012

Chemical and physical data
- Formula: C_{14}H_{22}N_{2}O_{3}
- Molar mass: 266.341 g·mol^{−1}
- 3D model (JSmol): Interactive image
- SMILES: O=C(Nc1ccc(OCC(O)CNC(C)C)cc1)C
- InChI: InChI=1S/C14H22N2O3/c1-10(2)15-8-13(18)9-19-14-6-4-12(5-7-14)16-11(3)17/h4-7,10,13,15,18H,8-9H2,1-3H3,(H,16,17); Key:DURULFYMVIFBIR-UHFFFAOYSA-N

Practolol (Eraldin, Dalzic, Praktol, Cardiol, Pralon, Cordialina, Eraldina, Teranol) is a beta blocker selective for the β_{1}-adrenergic receptor that has been used in the emergency treatment of cardiac arrhythmias. Practolol is no longer used as it is highly toxic despite the similarity of its chemical formula to propranolol.

== Side effects ==
Side effects are similar to those of other beta blockers, such as bronchoconstriction, cardiac failure, cold extremities, fatigue and depression, hypoglycaemia.

Furthermore, chronic use of practolol may cause oculomucocutaneous syndrome, a severe syndrome whose signs include conjunctivitis sicca and psoriasiform rashes, otitis and sclerosing serositis. This syndrome has not been observed with other such beta blockers.

After its introduction, keratoconjunctivitis sicca, conjunctival scarring, fibrosis, metaplasia, and shrinkage developed in 27 patients as an adverse reaction to practolol. Rashes, nasal and mucosal ulceration, fibrous or plastic peritonitis, pleurisy, cochlear damage, and secretory otitis media also occurred in some cases. Three patients suffered profound visual loss though most retained good vision. Symptoms and signs improved on withdrawal of the drug, but reduction of tear secretion persisted in most patients.

== Chemistry ==
The experimental log P of practolol is 0.79 and its predicted log P ranges from 0.53 to 0.83. It is a hydrophilic or low-lipophilicity beta blocker.

=== Synthesis ===
The part of the structure coming from (1) is based on paracetamol.

Practolol synthesis: Howe, Smith, NL 6512676; eidem, U.S. patent 3,408,387 (1966, 1968, to I.C.I.).

A synthesis is available which relates the absolute configuration of the more potent optical isomer to (+)-lactic acid. The glycerol derivative (2) is available from D-mannitol and retains optical activity as the two 1° alcohol functions are differentially protected. Displacement with sodium p-acetamidophenoxide (1, deprotonated paracetamol) gives 3 which is deprotected with dilute acid, the primary alcohol function is selectively reacted with one molar equivalent of tosyl chloride and pyridine, then treated with NaOH in dimethylsulfoxide to yield 3. Epoxide opening with isopropylamine leads to optically active prolactolol (4).

== History ==
The compound was studied by scientists at the Research Department of the ICI Pharmaceuticals Division in Alderley Park with physiologists at the University of Leeds in the early 1970s when it was known as compound ICI 66082; they utilised dogs, cats and rats in their investigations. Earlier research had also been carried out as early as 1967 on this and similar molecules by other research teams also with ICI.

== Society and culture ==
=== Market withdrawal ===
This drug has been withdrawn from the market in India.
