= Alprenoxime =

Chemical compound

Clinical data
- ATC code: None

Identifiers
- IUPAC name: 1-(2-allylphenoxy)-3-(isopropylamino)propan-2-one oxime
- CAS Number: 118552-63-9
- PubChem CID: 5489436
- ChemSpider: 4590144
- UNII: ZH6X5L4LHF
- ChEMBL: ChEMBL2105963

Chemical and physical data
- Formula: C_{15}H_{22}N_{2}O_{2}
- Molar mass: 262.353 g·mol^{−1}
- 3D model (JSmol): Interactive image
- SMILES: O(c1ccccc1C\C=C)C\C(=N\O)CNC(C)C
- InChI: InChI=1S/C15H22N2O2/c1-4-7-13-8-5-6-9-15(13)19-11-14(17-18)10-16-12(2)3/h4-6,8-9,12,16,18H,1,7,10-11H2,2-3H3/b17-14+; Key:XFQFSSGNEFUEPA-SAPNQHFASA-N

Alprenoxime is a beta blocker. It is a prodrug to alprenolol.
