= ATC code C07 =

ATC code C07 Beta blocking agents is a therapeutic subgroup of the Anatomical Therapeutic Chemical Classification System, a system of alphanumeric codes developed by the World Health Organization (WHO) for the classification of drugs and other medical products. Subgroup C07 is part of the anatomical group C Cardiovascular system.

Codes for veterinary use (ATCvet codes) can be created by placing the letter Q in front of the human ATC code: for example, QC07. ATCvet codes without corresponding human ATC codes are cited with the leading Q in the following list.
National versions of the ATC classification may include additional codes not present in this list, which follows the WHO version.

== C07A Beta blocking agents ==
=== C07AA Beta blocking agents, non-selective ===
C07AA01 Alprenolol
C07AA02 Oxprenolol
C07AA03 Pindolol
C07AA05 Propranolol
C07AA06 Timolol
C07AA07 Sotalol
C07AA12 Nadolol
C07AA14 Mepindolol
C07AA15 Carteolol
C07AA16 Tertatolol
C07AA17 Bopindolol
C07AA19 Bupranolol
C07AA23 Penbutolol
C07AA27 Cloranolol
QC07AA90 Carazolol

=== C07AB Beta blocking agents, selective ===
C07AB01 Practolol
C07AB02 Metoprolol
C07AB03 Atenolol
C07AB04 Acebutolol
C07AB05 Betaxolol
C07AB06 Bevantolol
C07AB07 Bisoprolol
C07AB08 Celiprolol
C07AB09 Esmolol
C07AB10 Epanolol
C07AB11 S-atenolol
C07AB12 Nebivolol
C07AB13 Talinolol
C07AB14 Landiolol

=== C07AG Alpha and beta blocking agents ===
C07AG01 Labetalol
C07AG02 Carvedilol

== C07B Beta blocking agents and thiazides ==
=== C07BA Beta blocking agents, non-selective, and thiazides ===
C07BA02 Oxprenolol and thiazides
C07BA05 Propranolol and thiazides
C07BA06 Timolol and thiazides
C07BA07 Sotalol and thiazides
C07BA12 Nadolol and thiazides
C07BA68 Metipranolol and thiazides, combinations

=== C07BB Beta blocking agents, selective, and thiazides ===
C07BB02 Metoprolol and thiazides
C07BB03 Atenolol and thiazides
C07BB04 Acebutolol and thiazides
C07BB06 Bevantolol and thiazides
C07BB07 Bisoprolol and thiazides
C07BB12 Nebivolol and thiazides
C07BB52 Metoprolol and thiazides, combinations

=== C07BG Alpha and beta blocking agents and thiazides ===
C07BG01 Labetalol and thiazides

== C07C Beta blocking agents and other diuretics ==
=== C07CA Beta blocking agents, non-selective, and other diuretics ===
C07CA02 Oxprenolol and other diuretics
C07CA03 Pindolol and other diuretics
C07CA17 Bopindolol and other diuretics
C07CA23 Penbutolol and other diuretics

=== C07CB Beta blocking agents, selective, and other diuretics ===
C07CB02 Metoprolol and other diuretics
C07CB03 Atenolol and other diuretics
C07CB53 Atenolol and other diuretics, combinations

=== C07CG Alpha and beta blocking agents and other diuretics ===
C07CG01 Labetalol and other diuretics

== C07D Beta blocking agents, thiazides and other diuretics ==
=== C07DA Beta blocking agents, non-selective, thiazides and other diuretics ===
C07DA06 Timolol, thiazides and other diuretics

=== C07DB Beta blocking agents, selective, thiazides and other diuretics ===
C07DB01 Atenolol, thiazides and other diuretics

== C07F Beta blocking agents, other combinations ==
=== C07FB Beta blocking agents and calcium channel blockers ===
C07FB02 Metoprolol and felodipine
C07FB03 Atenolol and nifedipine
C07FB07 Bisoprolol and amlodipine
C07FB12 Nebivolol and amlodipine
C07FB13 Metoprolol and amlodipine

=== C07FX Beta blocking agents, other combinations ===
C07FX01 Propranolol and other combinations
C07FX02 Sotalol and acetylsalicylic acid
C07FX03 Metoprolol and acetylsalicylic acid
C07FX04 Bisoprolol and acetylsalicylic acid
C07FX05 Metoprolol and ivabradine
C07FX06 Carvedilol and ivabradine
