= Oculomucocutaneous syndrome =

- Specialty: Ophthalmology

Oculomucocutaneous syndrome is characterized by keratoconjunctivitis sicca (dry eyes) and the resulting scarring, fibrosis, metaplasia, and shrinkage of the conjunctiva. It is a drug side effect observed in practolol and eperisone. It is speculated that antibodies against drug metabolites cause the syndrome.
