= Mepindolol =

Chemical compound

Clinical data
- ATC code: C07AA14 (WHO)

Identifiers
- IUPAC name: (RS)-1-[(2-Methyl-1H-indol-4-yl)oxy]-3-(propan-2-ylamino)propan-2-ol
- CAS Number: 23694-81-7
- PubChem CID: 71698
- ChemSpider: 64750
- UNII: 00Q31ER368
- KEGG: D07181
- CompTox Dashboard (EPA): DTXSID40865110
- ECHA InfoCard: 100.041.650

Chemical and physical data
- Formula: C_{15}H_{22}N_{2}O_{2}
- Molar mass: 262.353 g·mol^{−1}
- 3D model (JSmol): Interactive image
- Chirality: Racemic mixture
- SMILES: CC1=CC2=C(N1)C=CC=C2OCC(CNC(C)C)O
- InChI: InChI=1S/C15H22N2O2/c1-10(2)16-8-12(18)9-19-15-6-4-5-14-13(15)7-11(3)17-14/h4-7,10,12,16-18H,8-9H2,1-3H3; Key:NXWGWUVGUSFQJC-UHFFFAOYSA-N

Mepindolol (Betagon) is a non-selective beta blocker. It is used to treat glaucoma.

== Synthesis ==
The first reported synthesis of mepindolol in 1971 used 4-hydroxy-2-methylindole (9) with epichlorohydrin and then isopropylamine to add the sidechain which was known to produce beta blockers, by analogy with drugs discovered by Imperial Chemical Industries, such as propanolol. The requisite intermediate was synthesized in a multi-step procedure from 4-benzyloxyindole-2-carboxylic acid (1) which was converted into 9 by conventional chemistry.

== See also ==
- Pindolol
- Bopindolol
