= Cloranolol =

Names
- IUPAC name (RS)-1-(tert-butylamino)-3-(2,5-dichlorophenoxy)propan-2-ol

Identifiers
CAS Number	39563-28-5
3D model (JSmol)	Interactive image
ChEMBL	ChEMBL156791
ChemSpider	59229
KEGG	D07183
PubChem CID	65814
UNII	Q3U058H86V
CompTox Dashboard (EPA)	DTXSID30865962
- InChI: InChI=1/C13H19Cl2NO2/c1-13(2,3)16-7-10(17)8-18-12-6-9(14)4-5-11(12)15/h4-6,10,16-17H,7-8H2,1-3H3 Key: XYCMOTOFHFTUIU-UHFFFAOYAX
- SMILES: Clc1ccc(Cl)cc1OCC(O)CNC(C)(C)C

Properties
Chemical formula	C_{13}H_{19}Cl_{2}NO_{2}
Molar mass	292.20 g·mol^{−1}

Pharmacology
ATC code	C07AA27 (WHO)
- Except where otherwise noted, data are given for materials in their standard state (at 25 °C [77 °F], 100 kPa). Infobox references

Cloranolol (Tobanum) is a beta blocker.

== Synthesis ==
β-Adrenergic blocker. Prepn:
