= Bopindolol =

Chemical compound

Clinical data
- Trade names: Sandonorm
- Other names: LT 31-200
- AHFS/Drugs.com: International Drug Names
- Routes of administration: Oral
- Drug class: Beta blocker
- ATC code: C07AA17 (WHO)

Legal status
- Legal status: In general: ℞ (Prescription only)

Identifiers
- IUPAC name: (RS)-1-(tert-butylamino)-3-[(2-methyl-1H-indol-4-yl)oxy]propan-2-yl benzoate
- CAS Number: 62658-63-3
- PubChem CID: 44112
- DrugBank: DB08807
- ChemSpider: 40146
- UNII: KT304VZO57
- KEGG: D07537
- ChEBI: CHEBI:76749
- ChEMBL: ChEMBL357995
- CompTox Dashboard (EPA): DTXSID6022684

Chemical and physical data
- Formula: C_{23}H_{28}N_{2}O_{3}
- Molar mass: 380.488 g·mol^{−1}
- 3D model (JSmol): Interactive image
- SMILES: CC1=CC2=C(N1)C=CC=C2OCC(CNC(C)(C)C)OC(=O)C3=CC=CC=C3
- InChI: InChI=1S/C23H28N2O3/c1-16-13-19-20(25-16)11-8-12-21(19)27-15-18(14-24-23(2,3)4)28-22(26)17-9-6-5-7-10-17/h5-13,18,24-25H,14-15H2,1-4H3; Key:UUOJIACWOAYWEZ-UHFFFAOYSA-N

Bopindolol (INN), sold under the brand name Sandonorm among others, is a beta blocker used to treat hypertension. It has been marketed in a number of countries throughout the world, for instance in Europe.

== Pharmacology ==
Bopindolol is an ester prodrug of mepindolol. It acts as a non-selective or dual β_{1}- and β_{2}-adrenergic receptor antagonist. Bopindolol has intrinsic sympathomimetic activity (ISA) and membrane-stabilizing activity (MSA). Besides the β_{1}- and β_{2}-adrenergic receptors, bopindolol shows very low affinity for the β_{3}-adrenergic receptor and interacts with certain serotonin receptors such as the serotonin 5-HT_{1A} receptor with strong affinity.

== Chemistry ==
The predicted log P of bopindolol ranges from 4.45 to 4.7. It showed the highest predicted lipophilicity of 30 clinically relevant beta blockers, with the second most lipophilic beta blocker predicted to be the better-known penbutolol.

=== Synthesis ===
The reaction of 4-Hydroxy-2-methylindole [35320-67-3] (1) with epichlorohydrin in the presence of lye led to 2-methyl-4-(oxiran-2-ylmethoxy)-1H-indole [62119-47-5] (2). Addition of tert-butylamine led to 4-(2-Hydroxy-3-tert-butylaminopropoxy)-2-methylindole [23869-98-9] (3). Ester formation with benzoic anhydride [93-97-0] (4) in the presence of hexamethylphosphoric acid triamide [680-31-9] completed the synthesis of Bopindolol (5).

Thieme Patent: Starting amnine:

== History ==
Bopindolol is related to and was developed as a successor to pindolol. It was first described in the literature by at least 1977.
