= Carazolol =

Chemical compound

Clinical data
- AHFS/Drugs.com: International Drug Names
- ATCvet code: QC07AA90 (WHO)

Identifiers
- IUPAC name: 1-(9H-carbazol-4-yloxy)-3-(propan-2-ylamino)propan-2-ol
- CAS Number: 57775-29-8
- PubChem CID: 71739
- IUPHAR/BPS: 569
- ChemSpider: 64783
- UNII: 29PW75S82A
- ChEMBL: ChEMBL324665
- CompTox Dashboard (EPA): DTXSID00866648
- ECHA InfoCard: 100.055.387

Chemical and physical data
- Formula: C_{18}H_{22}N_{2}O_{2}
- Molar mass: 298.386 g·mol^{−1}
- 3D model (JSmol): Interactive image
- SMILES: OC(CNC(C)C)COc3cccc2c3c1c(cccc1)[nH]2

Carazolol is a high affinity inverse agonist (also referred to as a beta blocker) of the β-adrenergic receptor.
