= Atenolol =

Beta blocker medication

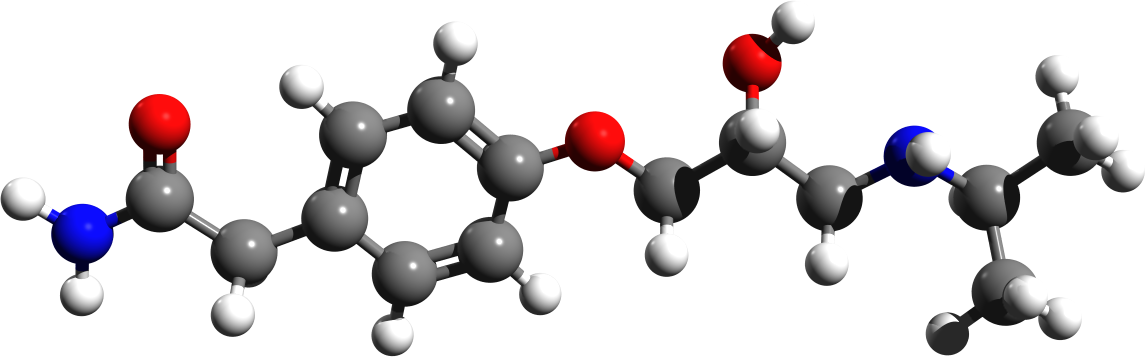

Clinical data
- Trade names: Tenormin, others
- Other names: ICI-66082; ICI66082
- AHFS/Drugs.com: Monograph
- MedlinePlus: a684031
- License data: US DailyMed: Atenolol
- Pregnancy category: AU: C
- Routes of administration: Oral, intravenous
- Drug class: Beta blocker; β-Adrenergic receptor antagonist; Selective β_{1}-adrenergic receptor antagonist; Sympatholytic agent; Antihypertensive agent; Anxiolytic
- ATC code: C07AB03 (WHO)

Legal status
- Legal status: AU: S4 (Prescription only); US: ℞-only; In general: ℞ (Prescription only)

Pharmacokinetic data
- Bioavailability: 50–60%
- Protein binding: 6–16%
- Metabolism: Minimal (~5%)
- Metabolites: • Hydroxyatenolol • Atenolol glucuronide
- Onset of action: IV: <5 minutes Oral: <1 hour
- Elimination half-life: 6–7 hours
- Duration of action: >24 hours
- Excretion: Oral: urine (40–50%), feces (50%); IV: urine (85–100%), feces (10%)

Identifiers
- IUPAC name: (RS)-2-{4-[2-Hydroxy-3-(propan-2-ylamino)propoxy]phenyl}acetamide
- CAS Number: 29122-68-7
- PubChem CID: 2249
- IUPHAR/BPS: 548
- DrugBank: DB00335
- ChemSpider: 2162
- UNII: 50VV3VW0TI
- KEGG: D00235
- ChEBI: CHEBI:2904
- ChEMBL: ChEMBL24
- CompTox Dashboard (EPA): DTXSID2022628
- ECHA InfoCard: 100.044.941

Chemical and physical data
- Formula: C_{14}H_{22}N_{2}O_{3}
- Molar mass: 266.341 g·mol^{−1}
- 3D model (JSmol): Interactive image
- Chirality: Racemic mixture
- SMILES: O=C(N)Cc1ccc(cc1)OCC(O)CNC(C)C
- InChI: InChI=1S/C14H22N2O3/c1-10(2)16-8-12(17)9-19-13-5-3-11(4-6-13)7-14(15)18/h3-6,10,12,16-17H,7-9H2,1-2H3,(H2,15,18); Key:METKIMKYRPQLGS-UHFFFAOYSA-N

Atenolol is a beta blocker medication primarily used to treat high blood pressure and heart-associated chest pain. Although used to treat high blood pressure, it does not seem to improve mortality in those with the condition. Other uses include the prevention of migraines and treatment of certain irregular heart beats. It is taken orally (by mouth) or by intravenous injection (injection into a vein). It can also be used with other blood pressure medications.

Common side effects include feeling tired, heart failure, dizziness, depression, and shortness of breath. Other serious side effects include bronchial spasm. Use is not recommended during pregnancy and alternative drugs are preferred when breastfeeding. It works by blocking β_{1}-adrenergic receptors in the heart, thus decreasing heart rate, force of heart beats, and blood pressure.

Atenolol was patented in 1969 and approved for medical use in 1975. It is on the World Health Organization's List of Essential Medicines. It is available as a generic medication. In 2023, it was the 75th most commonly prescribed medication in the United States, with more than 9 million prescriptions.

== Medical uses ==
Atenolol is used for a number of conditions including hyperthyroidism, hypertension, angina, long QT syndrome, acute myocardial infarction, supraventricular tachycardia, ventricular tachycardia, essential tremor (ET), and the symptoms of alcohol withdrawal.

The role for β-blockers in general in hypertension was downgraded in June 2006 in the United Kingdom, and later in the United States, as they are less appropriate than other agents such as ACE inhibitors, calcium channel blockers, thiazide diuretics and angiotensin receptor blockers, particularly in the elderly.

Atenolol has been used to treat anxiety disorders, such as generalized anxiety disorder and social anxiety disorder. It is thought that beta blockers do not directly treat psychological symptoms of anxiety, but can help control physical symptoms such as palpitations, and this may interfere with a positive feedback loop to indirectly reduce psychological anxiety. A 2025 systematic review and meta-analysis that included atenolol found widespread prescription of beta blockers for treatment anxiety disorders, but found no evidence of a beneficial effect relative to placebo or benzodiazepines in people with social phobia or panic disorder. However, the quality of evidence, including both numbers of studies and patients as well as quality and risk of bias of those studies, was limited.

== Contraindications ==
Contraindications of atenolol include sinus bradycardia, heart block greater than first degree, cardiogenic shock, and overt heart failure. There is no basis for use of atenolol in people with heart rate of lower than 50 bpm or systolic blood pressure of less than 100 mm Hg and hence these can be considered contraindications. It is also contraindicated in people with a history of hypersensitivity to atenolol or any of the drug product's other components.

== Side effects ==
Hypertension treated with a β-blocker such as atenolol, alone or in conjunction with a thiazide diuretic, is associated with a higher incidence of new onset type 2 diabetes mellitus compared to those treated with an ACE inhibitor or angiotensin receptor blocker.

β-blockers, of which atenolol is mainly studied, provides weaker protection against stroke and mortality in patients over 60 years old compared to other antihypertensive medications. Diuretics may be associated with better cardiovascular and cerebrovascular outcomes than β-blockers in the elderly.

Rarely, atenolol has been associated with induction of acute delirium.

== Overdose ==
Symptoms of overdose are due to excessive pharmacodynamic actions on β1-receptors, and with loss of cardioselectivity at high concentrations, β2-receptors. These include bradycardia (slow heartbeat), severe hypotension with shock, acute heart failure, hypoglycemia and bronchospastic reactions. Treatment is largely symptomatic. Hospitalization and intensive monitoring is indicated. Activated charcoal is useful to absorb the drug. Atropine will counteract bradycardia, glucagon helps with hypoglycemia, dobutamine can be given against hypotension and the inhalation of a β_{2}-mimetic such as hexoprenalin or salbutamol will terminate bronchospasms. Blood or plasma atenolol concentrations may be measured to confirm a diagnosis of poisoning in hospitalized patients or to assist in a medicolegal death investigation. Plasma levels are usually less than 3 mg/L during therapeutic administration, but can range from 3–30 mg/L in overdose victims.

== Interactions ==
Interactions with atenolol include catecholamine-depleting drugs like reserpine, calcium channel blockers, disopyramide, amiodarone, clonidine, prostaglandin synthase inhibitors like indomethacin, and digitalis glycosides. Most of these interactions involve either additive cardiovascular effects or reduction of atenolol's effects.

Atenolol is mainly eliminated renally without being metabolized by the liver or by cytochrome P450 enzymes. As a result, it has little or no potential for cytochrome P450-related drug interactions, for instance with inhibitors and inducers of these enzymes. Accordingly, the broad/non-selective cytochrome P450 inhibitor cimetidine had no effect on atenolol levels, whereas cimetidine has been found to significantly increase metoprolol and propranolol levels.

Beta blockers like atenolol can reduce or block the cardiovascular effects of sympathomimetics and amphetamines, such as hypertension and tachycardia.

Atenolol has been found to be safe in combination with the non-selective monoamine oxidase inhibitor (MAOI) phenelzine and actually improved orthostatic hypotension and hypertensive reactions with phenelzine. However, more research is still needed to assess whether addition of a beta blocker like atenolol to MAOI therapy is safe and effective for improving orthostatic hypotension with MAOIs.

== Pharmacology ==
=== Pharmacodynamics ===
Atenolol activities
| Site | K_{i} (nM) | Species |
|---|---|---|
| 5-HT_{1A} | 10,000 | Rat |
| 5-HT_{1B} | >10,000 | Rat |
| 5-HT_{2A} | >10,000 | Human |
| 5-HT_{2C} | >10,000 | Pig |
| α_{1} | ND | ND |
| α_{2} | ND | ND |
| β_{1} | 170–1,500 | Human |
| β_{2} | 8,140–9,550 | Human |
| β_{3} | >10,000 | Human |
| D_{1} | ND | ND |
| D_{2} | >10,000 | Rat |
Notes: Values are K_{i} (nM), unless otherwise noted. The smaller the value, the more avidly the drug binds to the site. Refs:

Atenolol is a beta blocker; that is, an antagonist of the β-adrenergic receptors. It is specifically a selective antagonist of the β_{1}-adrenergic receptor with no intrinsic sympathomimetic activity (i.e., partial agonist activity) or membrane-stabilizing activity. However, the preferential action of atenolol is not absolute, and at high doses, it can also block β_{2}-adrenergic receptors.

Beta-blocking effects of atenolol include reduction in resting and exercise heart rate and cardiac output, reduction of systolic and diastolic blood pressure at rest and with exercise, inhibition of tachycardia induced by isoproterenol (a non-selective β-adrenergic receptor agonist), and reduction of reflex orthostatic tachycardia.

The beta-blocking effects of atenolol, as measured by reduction of exercise-related tachycardia, are apparent within 1 hour and are maximal within 2 to 4 hours following a single oral dose. The general effects of atenolol, including beta-blocking and antihypertensive effects, last for at least 24 hours following oral doses of 50 or 100 mg. With intravenous administration, maximal reduction in exercise-related tachycardia occurs within 5 minutes and following a single 10 mg dose has dissipated within 12 hours. The duration of action of atenolol is dose-related and is correlated with circulating levels of atenolol.

=== Pharmacokinetics ===
==== Absorption ====
The oral bioavailability of atenolol is approximately 50 to 60%. The absorption of atenolol with oral administration is rapid and consistent but is incomplete. About 50% of an oral dose of atenolol is absorbed from the intestines, with the rest excreted in feces. Maximal concentrations of atenolol occur 2 to 4 hours following an oral dose, whereas peak concentrations occur within 5 minutes with intravenous administration. The pharmacokinetic profile of atenolol results in it having relatively consistent plasma drug levels with about 4-fold variation between individuals.

==== Distribution ====
The plasma protein binding of atenolol is 6 to 16%.

Atenolol is classified as a hydrophilic beta blocker with low lipophilicity and hence lower potential for crossing the blood–brain barrier and entering the brain. This in turn may result in fewer effects in the central nervous system as well as a lower risk of neuropsychiatric side effects. Only small amounts of atenolol are said to enter the brain. The brain-to-blood ratio of atenolol in humans has been found to be 0.2:1, whereas the ratio for the highly lipophilic propranolol has been found to range from 15:1 to 33:1.

==== Metabolism ====
Atenolol undergoes minimal or negligible metabolism by the liver. It has been estimated that about 5% of atenolol is metabolized. This is in contrast to other beta blockers like propranolol and metoprolol, but is similar to nadolol. In accordance with its lack of hepatic metabolism, the pharmacokinetics of atenolol are not altered in hepatic impairment, unlike the case of propranolol. Two metabolites of atenolol have been identified: hydroxyatenolol and atenolol glucuronide. It has been said that it is unknown if these metabolites are active. However, another source stated that hydroxyatenolol has one-tenth the beta-blocking activity of atenolol.

==== Elimination ====
Instead of by hepatic metabolism, atenolol is eliminated from the blood mainly via renal excretion. Atenolol is excreted about 40 to 50% in urine and 50% in feces with oral administration. Conversely, it is excreted 85 to 100% in urine unchanged and 10% in feces with intravenous administration. Only very small amounts of hydroxyatenolol and atenolol glucuronide are found in urine with atenolol.

The elimination half-life of atenolol is about 6 to 7 hours. The half-life of atenolol does not change with continuous administration. With intravenous administration, atenolol levels rapidly decline (5- to 10-fold) during the first 7 hours and thereafter decline at a rate similar to that with oral administration.

The elimination of atenolol is slowed in renal impairment, with the elimination rate being closely related to the glomerular filtration rate (GFR) and with significant accumulation occurring when the creatinine clearance rate is under 35 mL/min/1.73 m^{2}. At a GFR of less than 10 mL/min, the half-life of atenolol increases up to 36 hours.

== Chemistry ==
Atenolol is a substituted phenethylamine derivative. It is specifically β-phenylethylamine with an α-keto substitution and a 4- substitution on the phenyl ring.

The experimental log P of atenolol is 0.16 and its predicted log P ranges from −0.03 to 0.57. Atenolol showed the lowest predicted lipophilicity of 30 clinically relevant beta blockers.

== History ==
Atenolol was patented in 1969 and was approved for medical use in 1975.

== Society and culture ==
=== Changing medical practices ===
Atenolol has been given as an example of how slow healthcare providers are to change their prescribing practices in the face of medical evidence that indicates that a drug is not as effective as others in treating some conditions. In 2012, 33.8 million prescriptions were written to American patients for this drug. In 2014, it was in the top (most common) 1% of drugs prescribed to Medicare patients. Although the number of prescriptions has been declining steadily since limited evidence articles contesting its efficacy was published, it has been estimated that it would take 20 years for doctors to stop prescribing it for hypertension. Despite its diminished efficacy when compared to newer antihypertensive drugs, atenolol and other beta blockers are still a relevant clinical choice for treating some conditions, since beta blockers are a diverse group of medicines with different properties that still requires further research. As a consequence, reasons for the continued popularity of beta blockers cannot be fully attributed to a slow healthcare system – patient compliance factors, such as treatment cost and duration, also affect adherence and popularity of therapy.
