= Hydroxytertatolol =

Chemical compound

Clinical data
- Other names: 4-Hydroxytertatolol
- ATC code: None

Identifiers
- IUPAC name: 8-{2-Hydroxy-3-[(2-methyl-2-propanyl)amino]propoxy}-4-thiochromanol
- CAS Number: 111897-93-9
- PubChem CID: 163871
- ChemSpider: 143721
- UNII: RKM76FBC3F
- CompTox Dashboard (EPA): DTXSID70920605

Chemical and physical data
- Formula: C_{16}H_{25}NO_{3}S
- Molar mass: 311.44 g·mol^{−1}
- 3D model (JSmol): Interactive image
- SMILES: OC(CNC(C)(C)C)COc2cccc1c2SCCC1O
- InChI: InChI=1S/C16H25NO3S/c1-16(2,3)17-9-11(18)10-20-14-6-4-5-12-13(19)7-8-21-15(12)14/h4-6,11,13,17-19H,7-10H2,1-3H3; Key:RVGKVEPDZHPSBE-UHFFFAOYSA-N

Hydroxytertatolol is a beta blocker. It is a derivative of tertatolol.
