= Landiolol =

Chemical compound

Clinical data
- Trade names: Corβ, Landibloc, Onoact, Rapibloc, Raploc, Runrapiq, Rapiblyk, others
- Other names: ONO-1101
- AHFS/Drugs.com: Rapiblyk
- License data: US DailyMed: Landiolol
- Routes of administration: Intravenous
- Drug class: Antiarrhythmic
- ATC code: C07AB14 (WHO)

Legal status
- Legal status: CA: ℞-only; US: ℞-only; Rx-only

Identifiers
- IUPAC name: [(4S)-2,2-dimethyl-1,3-dioxolan-4-yl]methyl 3-[4-[(2S)-2-hydroxy-3-[2-(morpholine-4-carbonylamino)ethylamino]propoxy]phenyl]propanoate
- CAS Number: 133242-30-5; 144481-98-1
- PubChem CID: 114905; 164457
- ChemSpider: 102855
- UNII: 62NWQ924LH; G8HQ634Y17
- KEGG: D12410; D01847
- CompTox Dashboard (EPA): DTXSID10158026

Chemical and physical data
- Formula: C_{25}H_{39}N_{3}O_{8}
- Molar mass: 509.600 g·mol^{−1}
- 3D model (JSmol): Interactive image
- SMILES: CC1(OCC(O1)COC(=O)CCC2=CC=C(C=C2)OCC(CNCCNC(=O)N3CCOCC3)O)C
- InChI: InChI=1S/C25H39N3O8/c1-25(2)35-18-22(36-25)17-34-23(30)8-5-19-3-6-21(7-4-19)33-16-20(29)15-26-9-10-27-24(31)28-11-13-32-14-12-28/h3-4,6-7,20,22,26,29H,5,8-18H2,1-2H3,(H,27,31)/t20-,22+/m0/s1; Key:WMDSZGFJQKSLLH-RBBKRZOGSA-N; Key:DLPGJHSONYLBKP-IKGOIYPNSA-N

Landiolol, sold under the brand names Onoact, Rapibloc®, Sibboran® and Rapiblyk® among others, is a medication used for the treatment of supraventricular tachycardia, atrial fibrillation, and atrial flutter in perioperative, postoperative or other circumstances where short-term control of the ventricular rate with a short-acting agent is desirable. With the exception of the USA, landiolol is also indicated for non-compensatory sinus tachycardia where, in the physician's judgment, the rapid heart rate requires specific intervention. It is a β-adrenergic blocker; an ultra short-acting, β1-super-selective intravenous adrenergic antagonist, which decreases the heart rate effectively with fewer negative effects on blood pressure or myocardial contractility. In comparison to other β blockers, landiolol has the shortest elimination half-life (3 to 4 minutes), ultra-rapid onset of effect (heart rate begins to decrease immediately after completion of administration), and predictable effectiveness with inactive metabolites (heart rate returns to baseline levels at 30 min after completion of landiolol hydrochloride administration). The pure S-enantiomerstructure of landiolol is believed to develop less hypotensive side effects in comparison to other β-blockers. This has a positive impact on the treatment of patients when reduction of heart rate without decrease in arterial blood pressure is desired. It is used as landiolol hydrochloride.

Landiolol was approved for medical use in Japan in 2022, [10][11], Europe in 2016, Canada in November 2023, it has been approved in Bahrain, Kuwait, Qatar and Oman since October 2024, in the United States in November 2024 [12] and in Australia in June 2025.

== Medical use ==
Landiolol is indicated as an antiarrhythmic agent to treat

- Supraventricular tachycardia and for the rapid control of ventricular rate in patients with atrial fibrillation or atrial flutter in perioperative, postoperative, or other circumstances where short-term control of the ventricular rate with a short acting agent is desirable.
- Non-compensatory sinus tachycardia where, in the physician's judgment the rapid heart rate requires specific intervention.

Landiolol has been approved for the treatment of ventricular fibrillation or ventricular tachycardia in Japan.

In the United States, since August 2026, landiolol is indicated not only for the short-term reduction of ventricular rate in adults with supraventricular tachycardia including atrial fibrillation and atrial flutter but also for pediatric patients with supraventricular tachycardia.

Landiolol can be used as first-line treatment for acute ventricular rate control in patients with atrial fibrillation (Level I recommendation - 2024 ESC Guidelines for the management of atrial fibrillation developed in collaboration with the European Association for Cardio-Thoracic Surgery (EACTS): Developed by the task force for the management of atrial fibrillation of the European Society of Cardiology (ESC), with the special contribution of the European Heart Rhythm Association (EHRA) of the ESC. Endorsed by the European Stroke Organisation (ESO)). The 2024 ESC Guidelines for the management of AF recommend that “in selected patients who are hemodynamically unstable or with severely impaired LVEF, intravenous amiodarone, landiolol, or digoxin can be used.” They further state that “The ultra-short acting and highly selective beta- blocker landiolol can safely control rapid AF in patients with low ejection fraction and acutely decompensated heart failure, with a limited impact on myocardial contractility or blood pressure”.

== Mode of action ==
The drug acts as an ultra-short-acting β1-super-selective blocking agent. It is rapidly hydrolyzed to an inactive form by both carboxylesterase in the liver and pseudocholinesterase in the plasma, resulting in an elimination half-life of about 4 minutes. Landiolol is a highly selective β1 β-adrenoreceptor antagonist (the selectivity for β-1-receptor blockade is 255 times higher than for β-2-receptor blockade) that inhibits the positive chronotropic effects of the catecholamines adrenaline and noradrenaline on the heart, where β-1-receptors are predominantly located. Landiolol, as other β-blockers, is thought to reduce the sympathetic drive, resulting in reduction in heart rate, decrease in spontaneous firing of ectopic pacemakers, slowing the conduction and increase the refractory period of the AV node. Landiolol does not exhibit any membrane-stabilizing activity or intrinsic sympathomimetic activity in vitro. In preclinical and clinical studies, landiolol controlled tachycardia in an ultra-short acting manner with a fast onset and offset of action and further demonstrated anti-ischemic and cardioprotective effects. To date, landiolol has the shortest plasma half-time and the highest β1/β2-cardio-selectivity among β-blockers in clinical use.

In comparison, metoprolol demonstrates much lower cardioselectivity (landiolol is 100-times more cardio-selective than metoprolol and 8-times more cardio-selective than esmolol). Metoprolol has a 60- times longer half-life (3–4 hours compared to 3–4 minutes in the case of landiolol). FDA points out that CYP2D6 poor metabolizers (individuals with little or no CYP2D6 enzyme activity due to an inherited gene variation) as metoprolol will have decreased cardioselectivity due to increased metoprolol blood levels, since the gene variation reduces the conversion of metoprolol to inactive metabolites leading to almost 5-fold higher plasma concentrations of metoprolol.

Activation of β2-adrenergic receptors contributes to bronchial dilation and acceleration of alveolar fluid clearance in the pulmonary airway system. Consequently, a cardio-selective β1-blocker with limited effect on β2-receptor decreases the heart rate without the pulmonary adverse effects in patients with COPD or asthma. Pharmacological stimulation of β2-receptors increases coronary blood flow in healthy humans and in patients with mildly atherosclerotic coronary arteries. Thus, not only does a cardio-selective β1-blocker reduce myocardial oxygen demand during exercise, but it also unveils β2-receptor-mediated coronary exercise hyperemia, while reducing the heart rate selectively.

Interestingly, landiolol does not possess any sodium and calcium antagonistic properties, which makes it a more suitable cardio-selective β-blocker for patients with heart failure due to its lesser potency for negative inotropy, while offering higher potency for heart rate reduction. Contrary to landiolol, exposure to other β-blockers such as esmolol amplifies the re-expression of β-receptors which explains the drug tolerance effect seen during long-term esmolol infusion. Long term exposure of cells to β-blockers which act as pharmacochaperones will raise the total surface level of β1-adrenergic receptors, resulting in exaggerated responses to endogenous agonists such as catecholamines, if the treatment is suddenly stopped. This phenomenon has been described as the β-blocker withdrawal rebound. However, landiolol lacks appreciable pharmacochaperoning activity as landiolol can hardly permeate cell membranes due to its large polar surface area.

== Biotransformation ==
Landiolol is metabolized via hydrolysis of the ester moiety. In vitro and in vivo data suggest that landiolol is mainly metabolized in the plasma by pseudocholinesterases and carboxylesterases. Hydrolysis releases a ketal (the alcoholic component) that is further cleaved to yield glycerol and acetone, and the carboxylic acid component (metabolite M1), which subsequently undergoes β-oxidation to form metabolite M2 (a substituted benzoic acid). The β-1-adrenoreceptor blocking activity of landiolol metabolites M1 and M2 is 1/200 or less of the parent compound indicating a negligible effect on pharmacodynamics considering the maximum recommended landiolol dose and infusion duration.

Neither landiolol nor its metabolites M1 and M2 showed inhibitory effects on the metabolic activity of different cytochrome P450 molecular species (CYP1A2, 2C9, 2C19, 2D6 and 3A4) in vitro. The cytochrome P450 content was not affected in rats after repeated intravenous administration of landiolol. There is no data on a potential effect of landiolol or its metabolites on CYP450 induction or time dependent inhibition available.

iv β-blocker	max. elimination half-life (min)	cardio-selectivity (β1/β2)	metabilization
Landiolol	4	255	pseudocholinesterases
Esmolol	9	30	ery-esterases
Metoprolol	420	3	CYP2D6 (liver)

== History ==
The beneficial effects of landiolol have been demonstrated in over 65 clinical trials (pubmed search - February 2026). Landiolol was generally well tolerated, with a relatively low risk of hypotension and bradycardia. Most clinical trials with landiolol have been conducted in peri-operative settings for the treatment or prophylaxis of supraventricular tachycardia or tachyarrhythmia before or after cardiac and non-cardiac surgeries. Randomized clinical trials have been published to compare landiolol with placebo, diltiazem, verapamil and amiodarone in patients with or without heart failure. A meta-analysis of randomized trials evaluating the use of landiolol for controlling heart rate during perfusion procedure of myocardial infarction showed good tolerability of landiolol with reduction of infarct size and heart dysfunction, although with no impact on mortality, most of studies being underpowered. These findings suggest that heart rate control with landiolol may contribute to limiting myocardial damage during acute ischemia. Landiolol has been used for treatment of refractory electrical storm and is approved for this indication in Japan. The fast turnover of landiolol will diminish most adverse events due to self-limiting administration. Landiolol may be cardio-protective in septic rats by normalizing coronary microcirculation through blockage of sepsis-induced decrease in expression of VEGF signaling system but independent of inflammatory cytokines.

The efficacy and safety of landiolol in septic shock has been investigated in a multi-center prospective randomized controlled trial (JLAND 3S), and the results of the study have been published in the renowned Lancet Respiratory in 2020, demonstrating the clinical impact of landiolol in sepsis patients through significant reduction of new-onset arrhythmia and keeping patients within the target heart rate range.

Furthermore, landiolol demonstrated a positive clinical impact regarding ventilation-free days, ICU-free days and hospital-free days. Patients in the landiolol group had a survival rate of 88% by day 28, in contrast to a mortality rate of 20% in the control group by day 28. These are very important findings which may include landiolol in the standard of care for sepsis patients, since tachycardia and atrial fibrillation are key prognostic factors for sepsis. Additionally, tachycardia exceeding 100 beats per min (bpm) on admission to an intensive care unit (ICU) is a risk factor for worsening prognosis.

A publication in the Journal of Cardiology illustrated in a prospective real-world setting, the safety and effectiveness of landiolol for the treatment of atrial fibrillation or atrial flutter in chronic heart failure (over 1 000 patients at 209 medical institutions throughout Japan). In this survey, which is one of the largest studies ever performed in patients with chronic heart failure requiring intravenous rate control, reports of serious hypotension occurred in less than 1% of patients, which highlights the cardio-selectivity of landiolol with limited effect on blood pressure. Of note, over 70% of patients were in NYHA class III or IV (35% NYHA IV), and close to 50% had a LVEF below 40%. The median time to first return to sinus rhythm after administration of landiolol was 14 hours, and the median highest infusion rate was 3 μg/kg/min. In Acute Heart Failure with reduced LVEF, landiolol-associated with digoxin provides faster and safe HR reduction with early symptomatic benefit such decongestion compared with standard therapy.

Landiolol has been shown to be effective and safe for controlling rapid AF in patients with HFrEF with acute decompensated heart failure, leading to hemodynamic improvement and avoidance of short-term major adverse events. During landiolol treatment, patients with deteriorated LVOT-VTI (not improving stroke volume in response to HR decrease) predicted poor prognosis. Thus, early heart rate control may further detect high-risk patients using echocardiography to monitor patient response.

The excellent tolerance of landiolol at lower dosage (3–5 μg/kg/min) allows initiation of prophylactic use during surgery and post-operatively. Landiolol prophylaxis is associated with reduced incidence of postoperative atrial fibrillation without triggering adverse events related to a β-blockade. Optimized infusion scheme with continuing landiolol infusion in the post-operative period seems to be associated with a better response, while infusion limited to the intraoperative period may not be sufficient.

=== Legal status ===
Landiolol was approved for medical use in Japan in 2002, Europe in 2016, Canada in November 2023, it has been approved in Bahrain, Kuwait, Qatar and Oman since October 2024, in the United States in November 2024 and in Australia in June 2025.

=== Brand names ===
It is sold under various brand names including Rapibloc®, Raploc®, Runrapiq®, Landiobloc, Onoact, Corβ, Sibboran® and Rapiblyk®.
