= Prostaglandin inhibitors =

Drug class

Prostaglandin inhibitors are drugs that inhibit the synthesis of prostaglandin in human body. There are various types of prostaglandins responsible for different physiological reactions such as maintaining the blood flow in stomach and kidney, regulating the contraction of involuntary muscles and blood vessels, and act as a mediator of inflammation and pain. Cyclooxygenase (COX) and Phospholipase A2 are the major enzymes involved in prostaglandin production, and they are the drug targets for prostaglandin inhibitors. There are mainly 2 classes of prostaglandin inhibitors, namely non- steroidal anti- inflammatory drugs (NSAIDs) and glucocorticoids. In the following sections, the medical uses, side effects, contraindications, toxicity and the pharmacology of these prostaglandin inhibitors will be discussed.

== Medical Uses ==
=== Non- steroidal Anti- inflammatory drugs (NSAIDs) ===
NSAIDs are used as anti- inflammatory, antipyretic and analgesic agents. They can be administered through different routes, namely oral, rectal and topical. They can relieve mild to moderate pain. The dosage forms available for different NSAIDs and their respective medical uses are discussed as follows.

The available dosage forms for oral NSAIDs, rectal NSAIDs and topical NSAIDs are shown in the following table.

	Oral NSAIDs	Rectal NSAIDs	Topical NSAIDs
Available dosage forms	Tablets and capsules	Suppository	Gels, creams and suppository

The common medical uses of oral NSAIDs, rectal NSAIDs and topical NSAIDs are shown in the following table.

	Oral NSAIDs	Rectal NSAIDs	Topical NSAIDs
Medical Uses	1. Common Cold and Flu; Oral NSAIDs are commonly prescribed for relieving the symptoms of common cold and flu. They are shown to be effective to alleviate symptoms such as sneezing, headache, ear pain, muscle pain and malaise. However, studies show that NSAIDs are not effective in treating cough and blocked nose.: 2. Postoperative Pain; The American Society of Anesthesiologists Task Force on Acute Pain Management recommended the use of oral NSAIDs for managing postoperative pain in 2012. The commonly used NSAIDs for postoperative pain are celecoxib and ibuprofen. Trials have shown that these drugs can reduce pain to at least 50% and they are tolerable by most patients.: 3. Migraine; The therapeutic goals for migraine treatment are migraine prevention and symptomatic relief. The majority of oral NSAIDs such as ibuprofen, mefenamic acid, and indomethacin are shown to be effective to treat and prevent migraine. They do not have significant differences in terms of their therapeutic effects and are almost equally potent in migraine therapy. NSAIDs with less side effects are more preferred in migraine therapy.	Prevention of pancreatitis Rectal NSAIDs such as diclofenac and indomethacin are administered for the prevention of pancreatitis due to endoscopic retrograde cholangiopancreatography (ERCP). ERCP is a technique for treating liver and pancreatic disease. Acute pancreatitis is the most common complication of ERCP. Therefore, rectal NSAIDs are given to patients before ERCP as a measure to prevent post- ERCP pancreatits. Trials showed that rectal NSAIDs are more effective than oral NSAIDs to prevent post ERCP pancreatitis as it exerts its effects faster and its degree of absorption is higher. Endoscopic retrograde cholangiopancreatography (ERCP)	Osteoarthritis Topical NSAIDs, mainly diclofenac, are prescribed for patients with osteoarthritis. They are effectively absorbed in arms and knees. As osteoarthritis is a disease commonly found in the elderly (>65 years old), oral NSAIDs are seldom used as their systemic side effects are more severe in elderly patients. Therefore, topical NSAIDs are used for osteoarthritis to exert its local analgesic effects and minimize their systemic side effects in elderly patients. Manifestation of osteoarthritis in finger joints

=== Glucocorticoids ===
Glucocorticoids are potent anti- inflammatory drugs. They are mainly administered via oral and pulmonary route. Oral glucocorticoids are mainly prescribed for the prevention of chronic disease exacerbation. Inhalable glucocorticoids are effective in treating small airways inflammations. They are commonly used in the maintenance of chronic diseases, and to relieve symptoms during acute flare up of airway inflammations such as asthma. The dosage forms available for different glucocorticoids and their medical uses are discussed as follows.

The available dosage forms for oral glucocorticoids and inhalable glucocorticoids are shown in the following table.

	Oral Glucocorticoids	Inhalable Glucocoticoids
Available dosage forms	Tablets, capsules and liquid	Dry powder

The common medical uses of oral glucocorticoids and inhalable glucocorticoids are summarized in the following table.

	Oral Glucocorticoids	Inhalable Glucocorticoids
Medical uses	Rheumatoid arthritis Rheumatoid arthritis is an auto- immune disorder that affect joints. The common symptoms are warm, painful and swollen joints. Glucocorticoids exert anti- inflammatory effects to relieve the symptoms by inhibiting the synthesis of prostaglandin and leukotriene, and the release of collagenase and lysosomal enzymes. Manifestation of rheumatoid arthritis in finger joints	Asthma Inhalable glucocorticoids are the major drugs used for asthma treatment and maintenance. They suppress airway inflammation in asthma by inhibiting prostaglandin synthesis, enhancing gene expression of anti- inflammatory proteins, and suppressing inflammatory genes. They also dilate airway by reducing the production of leukotriene, a potent bronchoconstrictor in the circulation. The use of inhalable glucocorticoids in asthma

== Side effects ==
=== NSAIDs ===
The short term use of NSAIDs are rather safe, the manifestations of severe side effects are more commonly seen in the chronic use of NSAIDs.

==== Renal failure ====
The chronic use of NSAIDs inhibit the synthesis of prostaglandins and thromboxanes, which leads to renal vasoconstriction. This results in a decreased blood flow to the kidneys. Therefore, patients taking NSAIDs in long term are in higher risk of developing chronic renal diseases and nephrotoxicity due to reduced renal perfusion.

==== Gastric ulcers ====
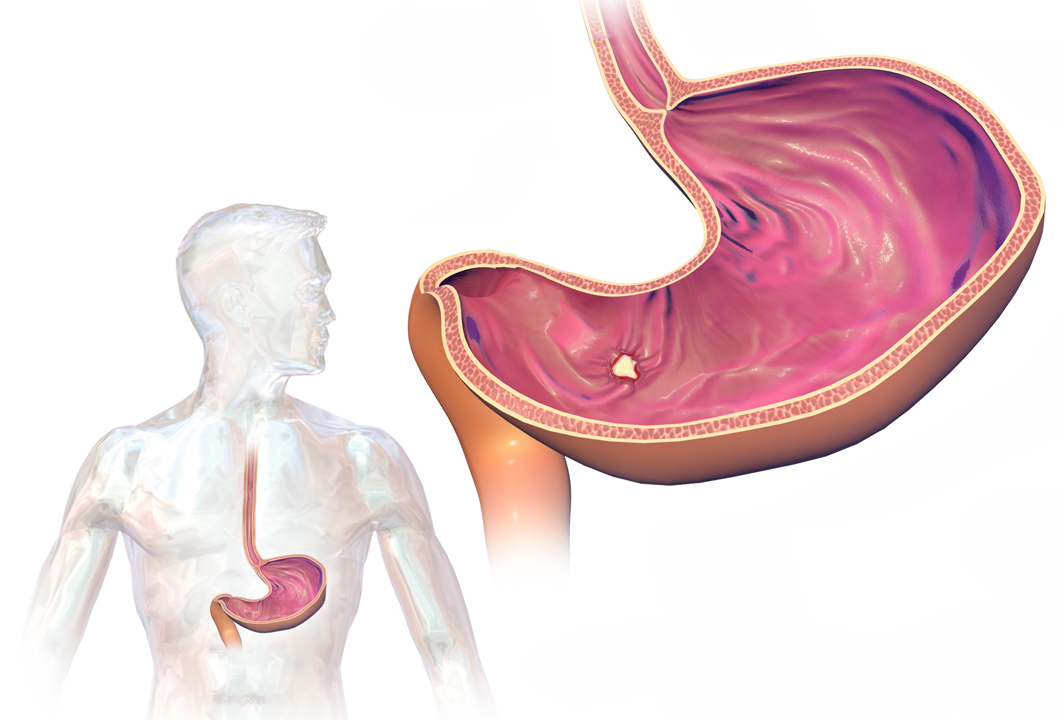
An image illustrating gastric ulcer

As NSAIDs inhibit prostaglandin synthesis, it reduces the blood flow to the stomach and weakens the stomach mucous membrane, making it more prone to gastric acid attack. This increases the risk of developing gastric ulcers. This can be prevented by taking drugs such as proton pump inhibitors, H2 receptor antagonists which suppress gastric acid secretions together with NSAIDs.

==== Congestive heart failure and hypertension ====
NSAIDs retain sodium and water in the circulation, which in turn increase the blood volume and blood pressure in the body. The production of natural vasodilator (prostaglandin) is also inhibited at the same time. Hence, the use of NSAIDs is associated with an increased risk of congestive heart failure and hypertension especially for elderly patients.

=== Glucocorticoids ===
==== Side effects in chronic use ====
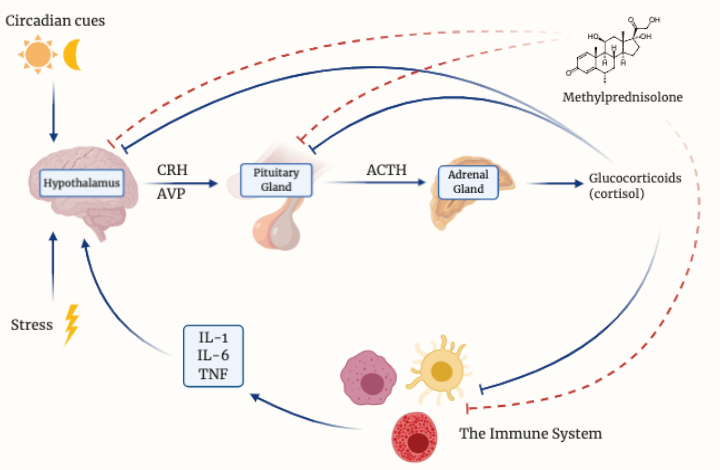
Glucocorticoid pathway in suppression of HPA axis

The chronic use of glucocorticoids suppress the activity of hypothalamic- pituitary-adrenal (HPA) axis. The severity of HPA axis suppression is directly proportional to the dose and the duration of therapy. HPA axis suppression results in a weakened immune system, making the patients more prone to infections in long term.

==== Side effects in short-term use ====
Short- term use of glucocorticoids creates minor disturbance in human body. The examples of short- term effects created by glucocorticoids are hyperglycemia, oscillation in blood pressure, psychiatric events and electrolyte disorders. These effects usually can be reversed once the glucocorticoids therapy is stopped.

== Contraindications ==
=== NSAIDs ===
==== Patients taking Anticoagulants ====
As NSAIDs inhibit cyclooxygenase, the production of thromboxane, a natural coagulator, is inhibited. Therefore, the risk of bleeding during the use of NSAIDs is intensified by concomitant use of anticoagulants.

==== Patients with Chronic Renal Diseases ====
As NSAIDs reduce blood flow to kidney by inhibiting prostaglandin synthesis, it leads to renal ischemia and a decrease in glomerular filtration pressure. As a result, the kidney functions of patients with chronic renal diseases is further worsen.

=== Glucocorticoids ===
==== Patients with Systemic Fungal Infections ====
Glucocorticoids reduces the number of healthy neutrophils in human body, leading to neutropenia. Neutropenia reduces the efficacy of antifungal drugs. Studies show that neutropenia together with high cumulative glucocorticoid concentration in circulation reduce the efficacy of invasive fungal infection treatment. Therefore, patients with fungal infections are not recommended with the use of glucocorticoids.

==== Patients with Diabetes Mellitus ====
Glucocorticoids raise blood glucose level via different mechanisms. They can stimulate endogenous glucose production by activating the genes involved; reduce glucose uptake by muscle and adipose tissue; induce muscle and adipose tissues to produce substrates involved in glucose production and inhibit the section and production of insulin in pancreatic β cells. All these raise blood glucose level and exacerbate diabetes mellitus. Thus, the use of glucocorticoids should be minimized or avoided for diabetes patients.

== Toxicity ==
=== NSAIDs ===
The most common signs of NSAIDs overdose are nausea, vomiting, blurred vision and drowsiness. NSAIDs toxicity can be reversed by gastric lavage. In severe cases, NSAIDs toxicity can lead to the following clinical conditions.

==== Central Nervous System (CNS) toxicity ====
Manifestation of nystagmus

NSAIDs overdose can lead to acute central nervous system toxicity. It can create CNS effects ranging from drowsiness to coma. Other symptoms such as ataxia, nystagmus, headaches, seizure, and disorientation are also the reported manifestations of CNS toxicity.

==== Acid- Base abnormalities ====
A large dose of NSAIDs, particularly ibuprofen, naproxen can lead to metabolic acidosis. Metabolic acidosis can further deteriorate into cardiac arrhythmia and electrolyte imbalance which can be fatal.

=== Glucocorticoids ===
The overdose of glucocorticoids exacerbate its side effects. Most of the toxicities induced can be reversed by discontinuing the therapy.

==== Cushing's Syndrome ====
A high dose of glucocorticoids suppress the release of corticotropin from the pituitary, leading to Cushing's Syndrome. The symptoms are weight gain on the upper back and the area between shoulders, thinning of arms and legs, and moon face.

Symptoms of Cushing's Syndrome.

==== Weakening the immune system ====
High- dose glucocorticoids increase the risk of patients' infection by bacteria, virus and fungus. The cells involved in the immune system are mainly phagocytes, neutrophils, monocytes, macrophages, natural killer cells, B cells, T cells, eosinophils, basophils and mast cells. Glucocorticoids significantly reduce the production of these cells in the human body, thereby weakening the immune system.

== Pharmacology ==
=== Pharmacokinetics ===
Pharmacokinetics refers to the study of absorption, distribution, metabolism and elimination of drugs in human body.

	NSAIDs	Glucocortiocids
Absorption	A majority of NSAIDs have good oral absorption. (Degree of absorption ranged from 55%- 100%)	Most glucocorticoids have good oral absorption (Degree of absorption ranged from 60% to 100%)
Distribution	NSAIDs are highly bound to plasma proteins, making them more difficult to distribute to the site of actions.	Glucocorticoids are distributed by binding with protein, mainly glycoprotein, transcortin and albumin.
Metabolism	The majority of NSAIDs undergo glucoronidation during phase II metabolism in the liver	Glucocorticoids undergo phase I and phase II metabolism in the liver. The common phase I metabolisms that glucocorticoids undergo are oxidation and hydrogenation. Glucocorticoids undergo glucoronidation and sulphation during phase II metabolism in the liver
Elimination	Renal Excretion	Renal Excretion

=== Pharmacodynamics ===
Pharmacodynamics refers to the study of how the drugs exert their actions in human body.

==== NSAIDs ====
NSAIDs inhibits the synthesis of prostaglandin by inhibiting cyclooxygenase (COX-1 and COX-2). NSAIDs with higher selectivity on COX-2 such as indomethacin, zomepirac and diclofenac have potent anti- inflammatory activity and fewer side effects on stomach and kidney.

==== Glucocorticoids ====
Phospholipase A2 is an enzyme to catalyze the release of arachidonic acid in our body. After arachidonic acid is released, it can be converted to prostaglandins by cyclooxygenase. Glucocorticoids work by inhibiting phospholipase A2, hence indirectly inhibiting prostaglandin synthesis.
