= Brain-to-blood ratio =

Statistic in pharmacokinetics

The brain-to-blood ratio, or brain–blood ratio, is a statistic in pharmacokinetics defined as the ratio of a drug's brain concentrations relative to its circulating blood concentrations. It is a measure of the ability of a drug to cross the blood–brain barrier and exert effects in the central nervous system.

Determinants of brain-to-blood ratio include physicochemical properties like molecular volume, molecular weight, polar surface area, charge state, hydrogen bonding (related to quantity of nitrogen and oxygen atoms), and hydrophilicity–lipophilicity. Other factors include plasma protein binding, active transport across the blood–brain barrier either into the brain or out of the brain by membrane transport proteins (transporters), and degree of binding to components of brain tissue.

An example of brain-to-blood ratio can be made with beta blockers. The highly lipophilic beta blocker propranolol has a brain-to-blood ratio in humans of 15:1 to 26:1, whereas the hydrophilic beta blocker atenolol is peripherally selective with a blood-to-brain ratio of 0.2:1.
