= Propranolol =

Beta blocker drug

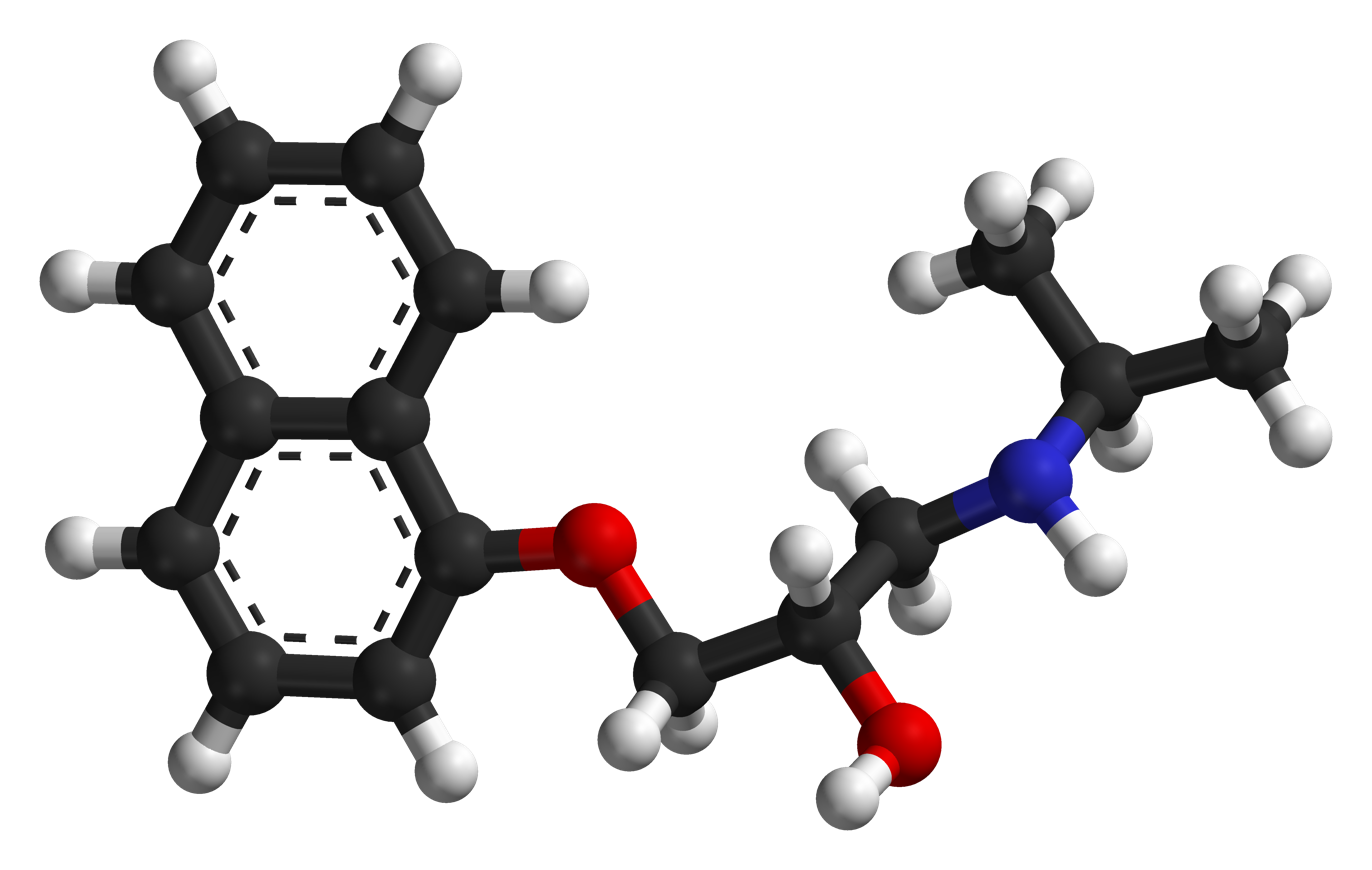

Clinical data
- Pronunciation: /proʊˈprænəˌlɒl/
- Trade names: Inderal, others
- Other names: AY-20694; AY20694, propranolol hydrochloride (USAN US)
- AHFS/Drugs.com: Monograph
- MedlinePlus: a682607
- License data: US DailyMed: Propranolol
- Pregnancy category: AU: C
- Routes of administration: Oral, sublingual, intranasal, rectal, intravenous
- Drug class: Beta blocker
- ATC code: C07AA05 (WHO) C07FX01 (WHO), C07BA05 (WHO)

Legal status
- Legal status: AU: S4 (Prescription only); CA: ℞-only; UK: POM (Prescription only); US: ℞-only; EU: Rx-only; SE: Rx-only

Pharmacokinetic data
- Bioavailability: Oral: 25% Sublingual: 63% Intranasal: ~100%
- Protein binding: 90% (albumin and α_{1}-acid glycoprotein)
- Metabolism: Liver (extensive) CYP1A2, CYP2D6; minor: CYP2C19, CYP3A4; aromatic hydroxylation (mainly 4-hydroxylation), N-dealkylation, side-chain oxidation, glucuronidation
- Metabolites: N-Desisopropylpropranolol; 4'-Hydroxypropanolol
- Elimination half-life: ~4 hours (range 3–8 hours)
- Duration of action: Up to 12 hours
- Excretion: Urine: 91%

Identifiers
- IUPAC name: (RS)-1-(propan-2-ylamino)-3-(1-naphthyloxy)propan-2-ol
- CAS Number: 525-66-6; as HCl: 318-98-9
- PubChem CID: 4946; as HCl: 62882
- IUPHAR/BPS: 564
- DrugBank: DB00571; as HCl: DBSALT000549
- ChemSpider: 4777; as HCl: 56610
- UNII: 9Y8NXQ24VQ; as HCl: F8A3652H1V
- KEGG: D08443; as HCl: D00483
- ChEBI: CHEBI:8499; as HCl: CHEBI:8500
- ChEMBL: ChEMBL27; as HCl: ChEMBL1671
- CompTox Dashboard (EPA): DTXSID6023525
- ECHA InfoCard: 100.007.618

Chemical and physical data
- Formula: C_{16}H_{21}NO_{2}
- Molar mass: 259.349 g·mol^{−1}
- 3D model (JSmol): Interactive image; as HCl: Interactive image
- Chirality: Racemic mixture
- Melting point: 96 °C (205 °F)
- SMILES: OC(COC1=C2C=CC=CC2=CC=C1)CNC(C)C; as HCl: Cl.CC(C)NCC(O)COC1=CC=CC2=CC=CC=C12
- InChI: InChI=1S/C16H21NO2/c1-12(2)17-10-14(18)11-19-16-9-5-7-13-6-3-4-8-15(13)16/h3-9,12,14,17-18H,10-11H2,1-2H3; Key:AQHHHDLHHXJYJD-UHFFFAOYSA-N; as HCl: InChI=1S/C16H21NO2.ClH/c1-12(2)17-10-14(18)11-19-16-9-5-7-13-6-3-4-8-15(13)16;/h3-9,12,14,17-18H,10-11H2,1-2H3;1H; Key:ZMRUPTIKESYGQW-UHFFFAOYSA-N

Propranolol is a medication of the beta blocker class. It is used to treat high blood pressure, some types of irregular heart rate, thyrotoxicosis, capillary hemangiomas, akathisia, performance anxiety, and essential tremor, as well as to prevent migraine headaches, and to prevent further heart problems in those with angina or previous heart attacks. It can be taken orally, rectally, or by intravenous injection. The formulation that is taken orally comes in short-acting and long-acting versions. Propranolol appears in the blood after 30 minutes and has a maximum effect between 60 and 90 minutes when taken orally.

Common side effects include nausea, abdominal pain, and constipation. It may worsen the symptoms of asthma. Propranolol may cause harmful effects for the fetus if taken during pregnancy; however, its use during breastfeeding is generally considered to be safe. It is a non-selective beta blocker which works by blocking β-adrenergic receptors.

Propranolol was patented in 1962 and approved for medical use in 1964. It is on the World Health Organization's List of Essential Medicines. Propranolol is available as a generic medication. In 2023, it was the 69th most commonly prescribed medication in the United States, with more than 9 million prescriptions.

== Medical uses ==
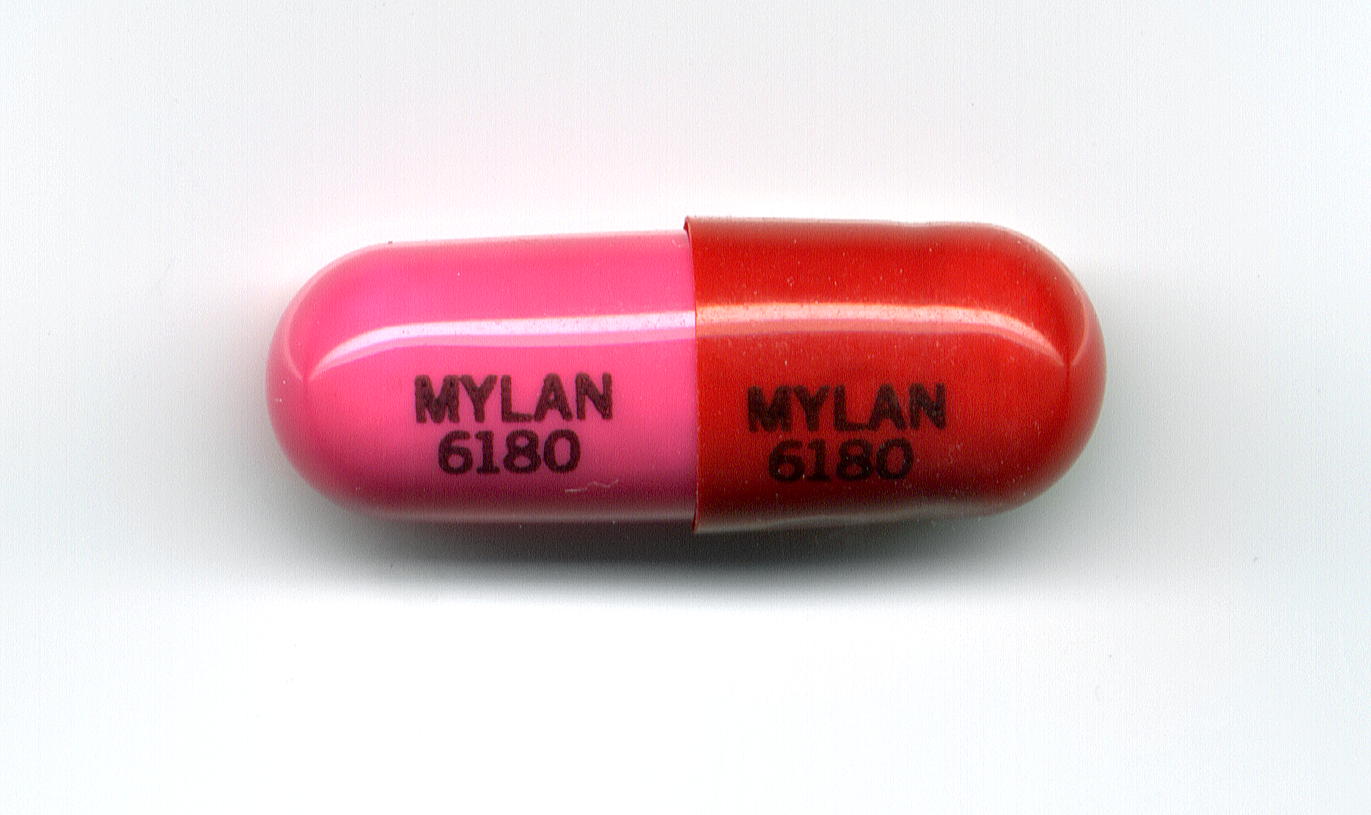
An 80 mg capsule of extended-release propranolol

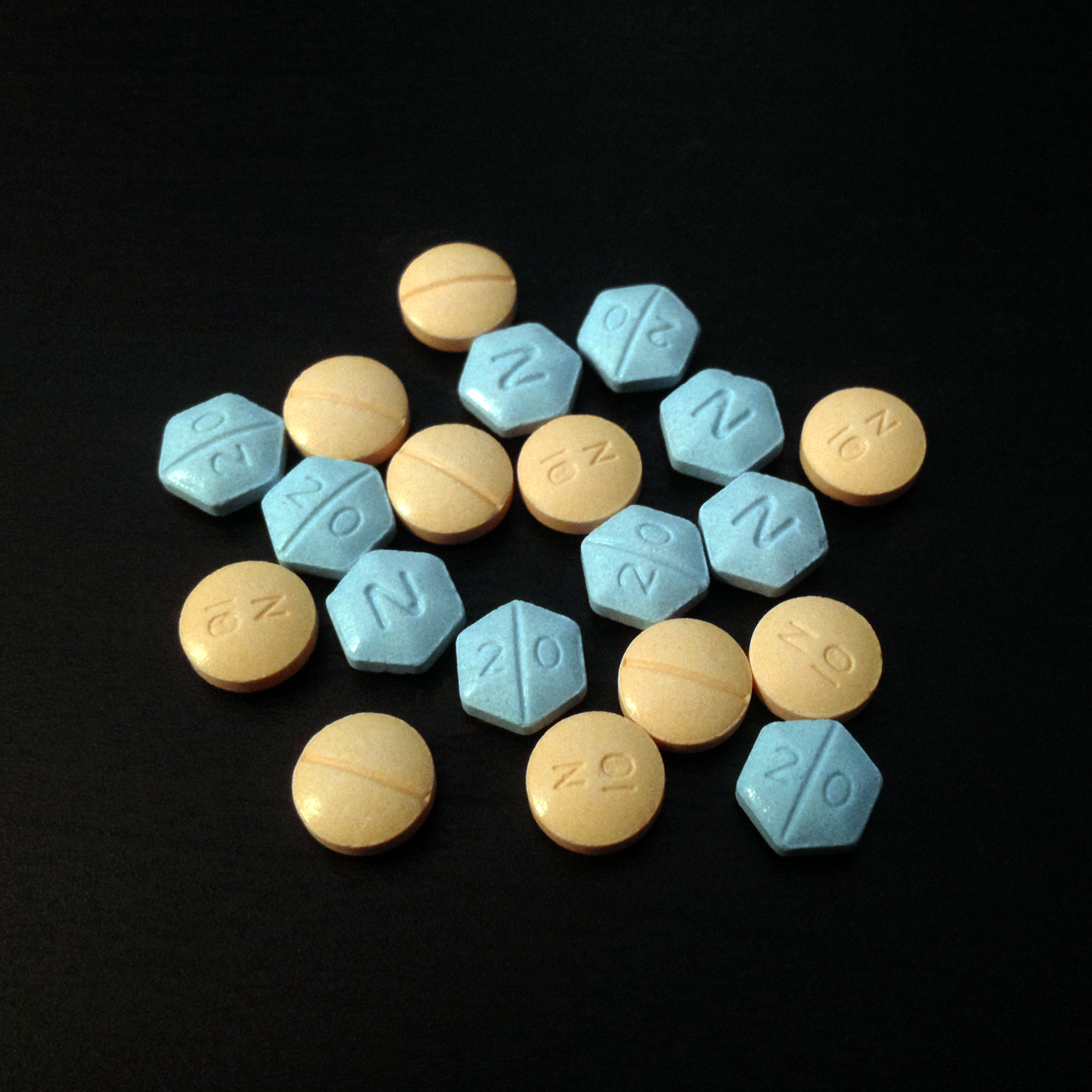
A mixture of 20 mg and 10 mg extended-release propranolol tablets

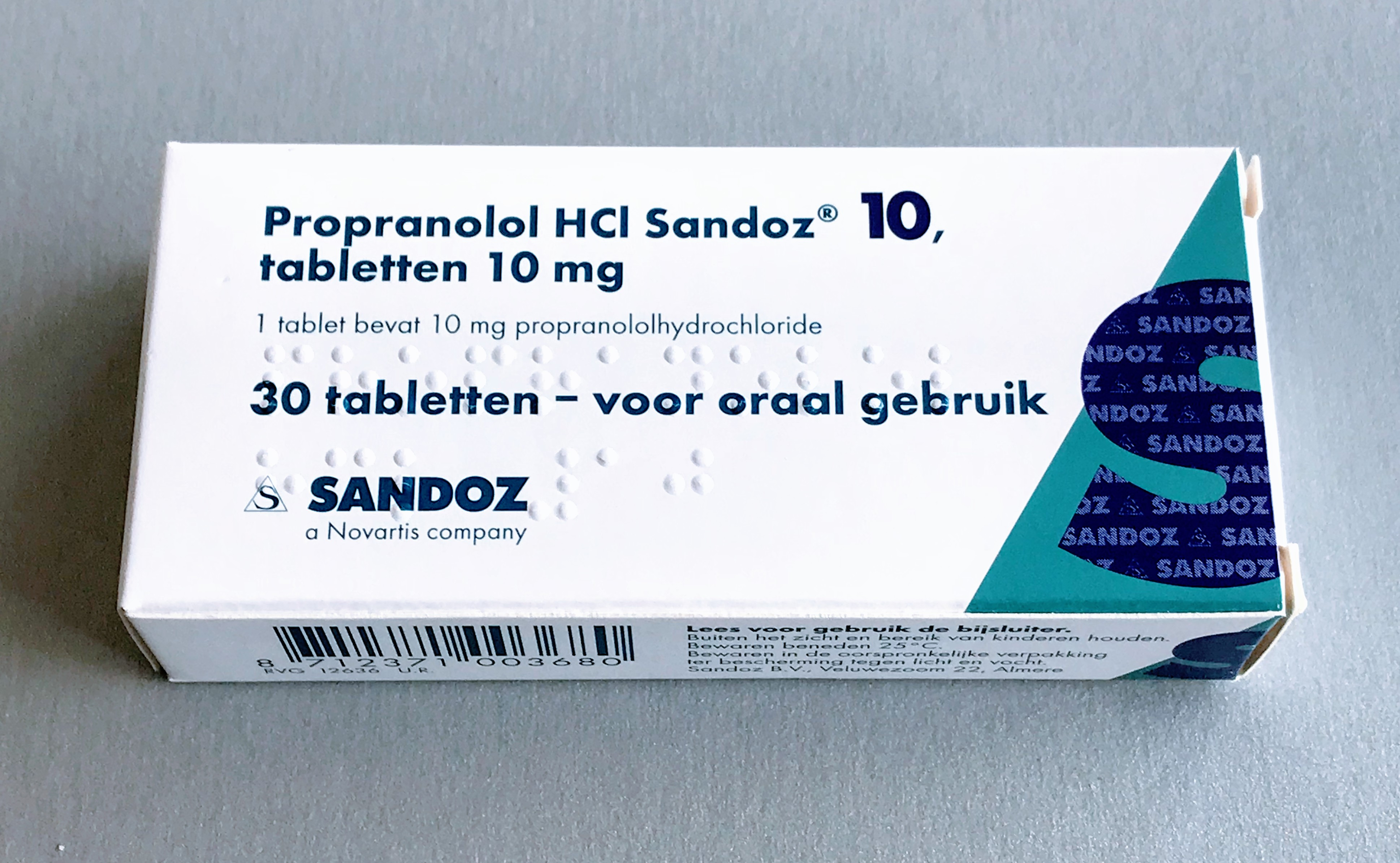
Propranolol blister pack

Propranolol is indicated for the treatment of hypertension (high blood pressure). angina pectoris, atrial fibrillation, myocardial infarction, migraine, essential tremor, hypertrophic subaortic stenosis, and pheochromocytoma (catecholamine-secreting tumors).

Propranolol is also indicated for the treatment of proliferating infantile hemangioma requiring systemic therapy.

Beta blockers were once a first-line treatment for hypertension in the United Kingdom. They were downgraded to fourth-line in 2006 because they do not perform as well as other drugs, particularly in the elderly, and there is increasing evidence that the most common beta blockers at usual doses carry an unacceptable risk of provoking type 2 diabetes.

=== Anxiety and related disorders ===
Propranolol is occasionally used to treat performance anxiety, although evidence to support its use in any anxiety disorders is poor. Its efficacy in managing panic disorder appears similar to benzodiazepines, while carrying lower risks for addiction or abuse. Although beta blockers such as propranolol have been suggested to be beneficial in managing physical symptoms of anxiety, its efficacy in treating generalized anxiety disorder and panic disorder remain unestablished. It is thought that beta blockers do not directly treat psychological symptoms of anxiety, but can help control physical symptoms such as palpitations and tremors. This may interfere with a positive feedback loop to indirectly reduce psychological anxiety.

A 2025 systematic review and meta-analysis found widespread prescription of beta blockers, namely propranolol, for treatment of anxiety disorders, but found no evidence of a beneficial effect relative to placebo or benzodiazepines in people with social phobia or panic disorder. However, the quality of evidence, including both numbers of studies and patients as well as quality and risk of bias of those studies, was limited. Findings were similar in a previous 2016 systematic review and meta-analysis.

Other beta blockers that have been used to treat anxiety disorders besides propranolol include atenolol, betaxolol, nadolol, oxprenolol, and pindolol.

Some experimentation has been conducted in other psychiatric areas:

- Post-traumatic stress disorder (PTSD) and specific phobias
- Aggressive behavior of patients with brain injuries
- Treating the excessive drinking of fluids in psychogenic polydipsia

==== Post-traumatic stress disorder and phobias ====
Propranolol is being investigated as a potential treatment for PTSD. Propranolol works to inhibit the actions of norepinephrine (noradrenaline), a neurotransmitter that enhances memory consolidation. In one small study, individuals given propranolol immediately after trauma experienced fewer stress-related symptoms and lower rates of PTSD than respective control groups who did not receive the drug. Due to the fact that memories and their emotional content are reconsolidated in the hours after they are recalled or re-experienced, propranolol can also diminish the emotional impact of already formed memories; for this reason, it is also being studied in the treatment of specific phobias, such as arachnophobia, dental fear, and social phobia. It has also been found to be helpful for some individuals with misophonia.

Ethical and legal questions have been raised surrounding the use of propranolol-based medications for use as a "memory damper", including altering memory-recalled evidence during an investigation, modifying the behavioral response to past (albeit traumatic) experiences, the regulation of these drugs, and others. However, Hall and Carter have argued that many such objections are "based on wildly exaggerated and unrealistic scenarios that ignore the limited action of propranolol in affecting memory, underplay the debilitating impact that PTSD has on those who suffer from it, and fail to acknowledge the extent to which drugs like alcohol are already used for this purpose".

=== Other uses ===
- Essential tremor. However, evidence for use for akathisia is insufficient.
- Migraine and cluster headache prevention and in primary exertional headache
- Hyperhidrosis (excessive sweating)
- Infantile hemangioma
- Glaucoma
- Thyrotoxicosis by deiodinase inhibition

Propranolol and other beta blockers may be useful in the treatment of aggression and agitation in contexts like people with schizophrenia or psychosis, brain injuries, and intellectual disabilities.

Propranolol may be used to treat severe infantile hemangiomas (IHs). This treatment shows promise as being superior to corticosteroids when treating IHs. Extensive clinical case evidence and a small controlled trial support its efficacy.

Propranolol is useful in the treatment of acute cardiovascular toxicity (e.g. in overdose) caused by sympathomimetics like amphetamine, methamphetamine, cocaine, ephedrine, and pseudoephedrine, including reducing elevations in heart rate and blood pressure caused by these agents. Other beta blockers are also used. However, the controversial yet possible phenomenon of "unopposed α-stimulation" with administration of selective beta blockers to block non-selective sympathomimetics potentially makes dual alpha-1 and beta blockers like labetalol and carvedilol more favorable for such purposes than selective beta blockers like propranolol. The rate of unopposed α-stimulation with selective beta blockers has been reported to be 0.4%, whereas no cases of unopposed α-stimulation have been reported with dual alpha and beta blockers like labetalol.

=== Available forms ===
Propranolol is available as propranolol hydrochloride tablets and capsules.

== Contraindications ==
Contraindications of propranolol include cardiogenic shock, sinus bradycardia (slow heart rate; <60 beats/minute), heart block greater than first degree, bronchial asthma, overt heart failure, and known hypersensitivity to propranolol. Other contraindications include reversible airway diseases, particularly asthma or chronic obstructive pulmonary disease (COPD), sick sinus syndrome, atrioventricular block (second- or third-degree), circulatory shock, and severe hypotension (low blood pressure).

== Side effects ==
=== Pregnancy and lactation ===
Propranolol is classified as pregnancy category as Australian Drug Evaluation Committee (ADEC) category C. Beta-blocking agents in general reduce perfusion of the placenta, which may lead to adverse outcomes for the neonate, including lung or heart complications, or premature birth. The newborn may experience additional adverse effects such as low blood sugar and a slower than normal heart rate.

Propranolol is highly bound to proteins in the bloodstream and is distributed into breast milk at very low levels. These low levels are not expected to pose any risk to the breastfeeding infant, and the American Academy of Pediatrics considers propranolol therapy "generally compatible with breastfeeding."

== Overdose ==
Propranolol overdose has been associated with symptoms including bradycardia and hypotension. These symptoms may be managed by drugs including glucagon, isoprenaline (isoproterenol), dopamine, phosphodiesterase inhibitors, or atropine, whereas epinephrine may provoke uncontrolled hypertension due to unopposed alpha stimulation and is not indicated. Propranolol overdose has also been associated with seizures. Cardiac arrest may occur in propranolol overdose due to sudden ventricular arrhythmias, or cardiogenic shock which may ultimately culminate in bradycardic PEA.

== Interactions ==
=== Pharmacodynamic interactions ===
Since beta blockers are known to relax the cardiac muscle and constrict the smooth muscle, they have an additive effect with other drugs that decrease blood pressure or decrease cardiac contractility or conductivity. Pharmacodynamic interactions may occur with other drugs affecting the cardiovascular system, including propafenone, quinidine, amiodarone, cardiac glycosides, calcium channel blockers like verapamil and diltiazem, ACE inhibitors, alpha blockers like prazosin, catecholamine-depleting drugs like reserpine, ergot alkaloids, and adrenergic receptor agonists including epinephrine (adrenaline), isoprenaline (isoproterenol), dobutamine, β_{2}-adrenergic receptor agonists like salbutamol, levosalbutamol, formoterol, salmeterol, and clenbuterol, and α_{2}-adrenergic receptor agonists like clonidine. Tricyclic antidepressants (TCAs) and monoamine oxidase inhibitors (MAOIs) have hypotensive side effects and these may be exacerbated by propranolol. Hypotension and cardiac arrest have been reported with the combination of propranolol and haloperidol. Nonsteroidal anti-inflammatory drugs (NSAIDs), which include drugs like ibuprofen, naproxen, and aspirin, have been reported to blunt the antihypertensive effects of beta blockers like propranolol. The NSAID indomethacin specifically may reduce the efficacy of propranolol in decreasing heart rate and blood pressure.

=== Effects of drugs on propranolol ===
Propranolol is metabolized by cytochrome P450 enzymes including CYP2D6, CYP1A2, and CYP2C19. Levels of propranolol may be increased by CYP2D6 inhibitors such as amiodarone, bupropion, cimetidine, duloxetine, fluoxetine, paroxetine, propafenone, quinidine, and ritonavir, by CYP1A2 inhibitors such as imipramine, cimetidine, ciprofloxacin, fluvoxamine, isoniazid, theophylline, zileuton, zolmitriptan, and rizatriptan, and by CYP2C19 inhibitors such as fluconazole, cimetidine, fluoxetine, fluvoxamine, teniposide, and tolbutamide. No interactions with propranolol were observed with ranitidine, lansoprazole, or omeprazole. Propranolol levels may be reduced by inducers of hepatic metabolism including rifampin, alcohol, phenytoin, phenobarbital, and cigarette smoking.

The CYP2D6 inhibitor quinidine has been found to increase propranolol levels by 2- to 3-fold. The CYP1A2 inhibitor fluvoxamine has been found to increase propranolol levels by 5-fold. The calcium channel blocker nisoldipine increased peak levels of propranolol by 1.5-fold and area-under-the-curve levels by 1.3-fold, while nicardipine increased propranolol peak levels by 1.8-fold and area-under-the-curve levels by 1.5-fold. Conversely, verapamil does not affect the pharmacokinetics of propranolol and vice-versa. The CYP1A2 inhibitor zolmitriptan increased peak propranolol levels by 1.4-fold and area-under-the-curve levels by 1.56-fold, while the CYP1A2 inhibitor rizatriptan increased propranolol peak levels by 1.8-fold and area-under-the-curve levels by 1.7-fold. Chlorpromazine has been found to increase propranolol levels by 1.7-fold. The non-selective CYP450 inhibitor cimetidine has been found to increase peak propranolol levels by 1.4-fold and area-under-the-curve levels by 1.5-fold. Cigarette smoking, which induces CYP1A2, has been found to increase the clearance of propranolol by 77%, resulting in decreased propranolol concentrations. The lipid-lowering drugs cholestyramine and colestipol decreased propranolol levels by up to 50%. Aluminum hydroxide gel may decrease propranolol levels. Alcohol may increase propranolol levels.

=== Effects of propranolol on other drugs ===
Propranolol has been found to increase area-under-the-curve levels of propafenone by more than 3-fold. It has been found to increase lidocaine levels by 1.3-fold. The drug has been found to increase peak and area-under-the-curve levels of nifedipine by 1.6-fold and 1.8-fold, respectively. Propranolol decreases theophylline clearance by 30 to 52%. Propranolol inhibits the metabolism of the benzodiazepine diazepam and can increase exposure to diazepam. Conversely, propranolol does not affect various other benzodiazepines, including oxazepam, triazolam, lorazepam, and alprazolam. High-dose long-acting propranolol has been found to increase thioridazine levels by 1.6- to 4.7-fold and levels of its metabolite mesoridazine by 1.3- to 3.1-fold. Propranolol decreased lovastatin or pravastatin area-under-the-curve levels by 18 to 23% but did not affect fluvastatin. It may decrease triiodothyronine (T_{3}) levels when taken with thyroxine (T_{4}). Propranolol has been found to increase the bioavailability and effects of warfarin.

== Pharmacology ==
=== Pharmacodynamics ===
Propranolol activities
Site	K_{i} (nM)	Species	Ref
5-HT_{1A}	55–272 (K_{i}); 29 (–) (K_{i}); 128 (–) (EC_{50}); 15% (–) (E_{max})	Human; Human; Human; Human	
5-HT_{1B}	56–85	Rat	
5-HT_{1D}	4,070	Pig	
5-HT_{2A}	4,280	Human	
5-HT_{2B}	457–513 (+); 166–316 (–)	Human; Human	
5-HT_{2C}	61,700 (+); 5,010 (–); 736–2,457	Human; Human; Rodent	
5-HT_{3}	>10,000	Human	
α_{1}	ND	ND	ND
α_{2}	1,297–2,789	Rat	
β_{1}	0.02–2.69	Human	
β_{2}	0.01–0.61	Human	
β_{3}	450	Mouse	
D_{1}	>10,000	Human	
D_{2}	>10,000	Human	
H_{1}	>10,000	Human	
SERT	3,700	Rat	
NET	5,000 (IC_{50})	Rat	
DAT	29,000 (IC_{50})	Rat	
VDCC	>10,000	Rat	
Notes: Values are K_{i} (nM), unless otherwise noted. The smaller the value, the more avidly the drug binds to the site. Refs:

Propranolol is classified as a competitive non-cardioselective sympatholytic beta blocker. It is lipid soluble and also has sodium channel-blocking effects. Propranolol is a non-selective β-adrenergic receptor antagonist, or beta blocker; that is, it blocks the action of epinephrine (adrenaline) and norepinephrine (noradrenaline) at both β_{1}- and β_{2}-adrenergic receptors. It has little intrinsic sympathomimetic activity, but has strong membrane stabilizing activity (only at high blood concentrations, e.g. overdose). Propranolol can cross the blood–brain barrier and exert effects in the central nervous system in addition to its peripheral activity.

In addition to blockade of adrenergic receptors, propranolol has very weak inhibitory effects on the norepinephrine transporter and/or weakly stimulates norepinephrine release (i.e., the concentration of norepinephrine is increased in the synapse). Since propranolol blocks β-adrenoceptors, the increase in synaptic norepinephrine only results in α-adrenoceptor activation, with the α_{1}-adrenoceptor being particularly important for effects observed in animal models. Therefore, it can be looked upon as a weak indirect α_{1}-adrenoceptor agonist in addition to potent β-adrenoceptor antagonist. In addition to its effects on the adrenergic system, there is evidence that indicates that propranolol may act as a relatively weak antagonist of certain serotonin receptors, namely the 5-HT_{1A}, 5-HT_{1B}, and 5-HT_{2B} receptors. The latter may be involved in the effectiveness of propranolol in the treatment of migraine at high doses. (–)-Propranolol is not a silent antagonist of the serotonin 5-HT_{1A} receptor but is instead a very weak partial agonist of the receptor.

Both enantiomers of propranolol have a local anesthetic (topical) effect, which is normally mediated by blockade of voltage-gated sodium channels. Studies have demonstrated propranolol's ability to block cardiac, neuronal, and skeletal voltage-gated sodium channels, accounting for its known membrane stabilizing effect and antiarrhythmic and other central nervous system effects.

==== Mechanism of action ====
Propranolol is a non-selective beta receptor antagonist. This means that it does not have preference to β_{1} or β_{2} receptors. It competes with sympathomimetic neurotransmitters for binding to receptors, which inhibits sympathetic stimulation of the heart. Blockage of neurotransmitter binding to β_{1} receptors on cardiac myocytes inhibits activation of adenylate cyclase, which in turn inhibits cAMP synthesis leading to reduced Protein kinase A (PKA) activation. This results in less calcium influx to cardiac myocytes through voltage-gated L-type calcium channels, meaning there is a decreased sympathetic effect on cardiac cells, resulting in antihypertensive effects including reduced heart rate and lower arterial blood pressure. Blocking neurotransmitter activity at β_{2} receptors in vascular smooth muscle cells causes vasoconstriction, leading to hypertension.

=== Pharmacokinetics ===
==== Absorption ====
Propranolol is rapidly and completely absorbed, with peak plasma levels achieved about 2 hours (range 1–3 hours) after ingestion. Its oral bioavailability is approximately 25%. Despite complete absorption, propranolol has a variable bioavailability due to extensive first-pass metabolism. Hepatic impairment therefore increases its bioavailability. Therapeutic plasma concentrations are typically between 0.02 and 0.3 mg/L. Toxicity has been reported at concentrations of 1 mg/L and above, with coma or death associated with concentrations of 4 to 10 mg/L and above. Coadministration with food appears to enhance bioavailability but does not hasten its time to peak levels. Propranolol can be absorbed along the whole intestine with the main absorption site being the colon, which means people who have lost their colon due to surgery may absorb less propranolol. Propranolol shows marked interindividual variability in pharmacokinetics, with propranolol levels varying 20-fold in different individuals.

==== Distribution ====
The volume of distribution of propranolol is about 4 L/kg or 320 L. The plasma protein binding of propranolol is approximately 90%, with a range of 85 to 96% in different studies. Propranolol is a highly lipophilic drug achieving high concentrations in the brain. The brain-to-blood ratio of propranolol in humans ranges from 15:1 to 33:1, whereas the ratio for the peripherally selective beta blocker atenolol has been found to be 0.2:1.

==== Metabolism ====
Propranolol undergoes metabolism via aromatic hydroxylation (mainly 4-hydroxylation), N-dealkylation, side-chain oxidation, and glucuronidation. The metabolism of propranolol involves cytochrome P450 enzymes including CYP2D6, CYP1A2, and CYP2C19. CYP1A2 and CYP2D6 have a major role, while CYP2C19 and CYP3A4 have a minor role. The main metabolite 4-hydroxypropranolol, which has a longer elimination half-life than propranolol, is also pharmacologically active.

==== Elimination ====
Propranolol is eliminated in urine. Approximately 91% of an oral dose of propranolol is eliminated in urine as 12 metabolites. Only about 1 to 4% of propranolol is excreted unchanged in urine or feces.

The elimination half-life of propranolol ranges from 2.8 to 8 hours in different studies, with a typical half-life of around 4 hours. The duration of action of a single oral dose is longer than the half-life and may be up to 12 hours if the single dose is high enough (e.g., 80 mg).

=== Pharmacogenomics ===
There were no significant differences in area-under-the-curve levels of propranolol in CYP2D6 poor metabolizers versus extensive metabolizers. However, area-under-the-curve propranolol levels were about 2.5-fold higher in Caucasian CYP2D6 poor metabolizers or Chinese people with a non-functional CYP2D6 gene. The contribution of CYP2D6 to the metabolism of propranolol is less than with metoprolol and is described as only "marginal".

== Chemistry ==
Propranolol is a racemic mixture of 2 enantiomers where the S(-)-enantiomer has approximately 100 times the binding affinity for beta adrenergic receptors. It is a propanolamine, a secondary amine and functionally related to 1-naphthol.

Propranolol is highly lipophilic. The experimental log P of propranolol is 3.0 to 3.48 and its predicted log P ranges from 2.20 to 3.10.

== History ==
Scottish scientist James W. Black developed propranolol in the 1960s. It was the first beta blocker effectively used in the treatment of coronary artery disease and hypertension. Black received the Nobel Prize in Physiology or Medicine in 1988 for this discovery. Propranolol is on the WHO Model list of essential medicines.

Newer, more cardio-selective beta blockers (such as bisoprolol, nebivolol, carvedilol, or metoprolol) are used preferentially in the treatment of hypertension.

== Society and culture ==
=== Performance enhancement ===
In a 1987 study by the International Conference of Symphony and Opera Musicians, it was reported that 27% of interviewed members said they used beta blockers such as propranolol for musical performances. For about 10 to 16% of performers, their degree of stage fright is considered pathological. Propranolol is used by musicians, actors, and public speakers for its ability to treat anxiety symptoms activated by the sympathetic nervous system. It has also been used as a performance-enhancing drug in sports where high accuracy is required, including archery, shooting, golf, and snooker. In the 2008 Summer Olympics, 50-metre pistol silver medalist and 10-metre air pistol bronze medalist Kim Jong-su tested positive for propranolol and was stripped of his medals.

=== Brand names ===
Propranolol was first marketed under the brand name Inderal, manufactured by ICI Pharmaceuticals (now AstraZeneca), in 1965. "Inderal" is a quasi-anagram of "Alderlin", the trade name of pronethalol (which propranolol replaced); both names are an homage to Alderley Park, the ICI headquarters where the drugs were first developed.

Propranolol is also sold under the brand names Avlocardyl, Deralin, Dociton, Hemangeol, Inderalici, InnoPran XL, Indoblok, Sumial, Anaprilin, and Bedranol SR (Sandoz). In India, it is sold under brand names such as Ciplar and Ciplar LA by Cipla.
