= Pindolol =

Type of beta blocker drug

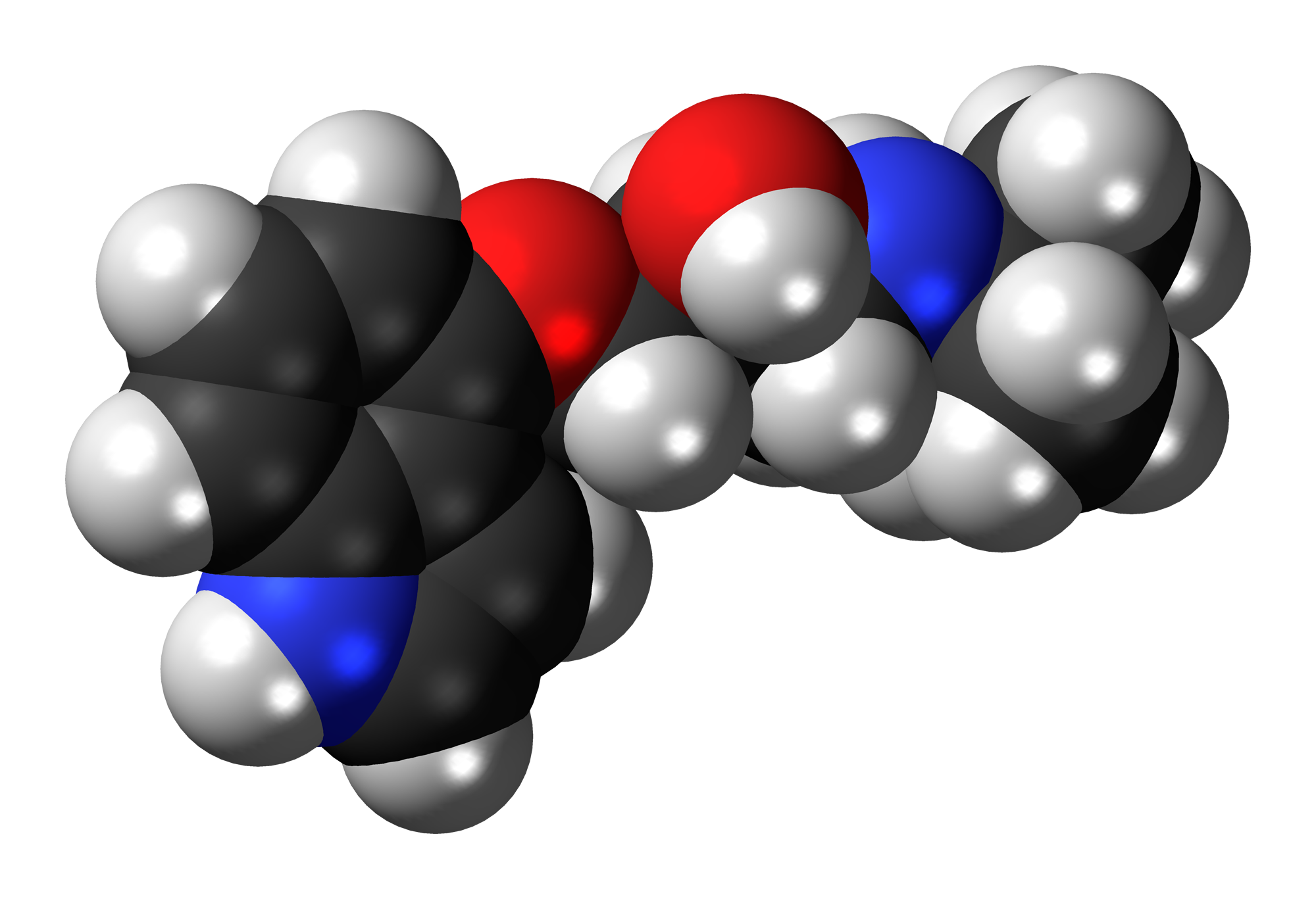

Clinical data
- Trade names: Visken, others
- AHFS/Drugs.com: Monograph
- MedlinePlus: a684032
- Pregnancy category: AU: C
- Routes of administration: By mouth, intravenous
- Drug class: Beta blocker; β-Adrenergic receptor antagonist; Non-selective β_{1}- and β_{2}-adrenergic receptor receptor antagonist
- ATC code: C07AA03 (WHO)

Legal status
- Legal status: In general: ℞ (Prescription only)

Pharmacokinetic data
- Bioavailability: 50% to 95%
- Metabolism: Hepatic
- Elimination half-life: 3–4 hours
- Excretion: Renal

Identifiers
- IUPAC name: (RS)-1-[(1H-indol-4-yl)oxy]-3-(isopropylamino)propan-2-ol
- CAS Number: 13523-86-9
- PubChem CID: 4828
- IUPHAR/BPS: 91
- DrugBank: DB00960
- ChemSpider: 4662
- UNII: BJ4HF6IU1D
- KEGG: D00513
- ChEBI: CHEBI:8214
- ChEMBL: ChEMBL500
- CompTox Dashboard (EPA): DTXSID8023476
- ECHA InfoCard: 100.033.501

Chemical and physical data
- Formula: C_{14}H_{20}N_{2}O_{2}
- Molar mass: 248.326 g·mol^{−1}
- 3D model (JSmol): Interactive image
- Chirality: Racemic mixture
- SMILES: CC(C)NCC(O)COc2cccc1[nH]ccc12
- InChI: InChI=1S/C14H20N2O2/c1-10(2)16-8-11(17)9-18-14-5-3-4-13-12(14)6-7-15-13/h3-7,10-11,15-17H,8-9H2,1-2H3; Key:JZQKKSLKJUAGIC-UHFFFAOYSA-N

Pindolol, sold under the brand name Visken among others, is a non-selective beta blocker which is used in the treatment of hypertension. It is also an antagonist of the serotonin 5-HT_{1A} receptor, preferentially blocking inhibitory 5-HT_{1A} autoreceptors, and has been researched as an add-on therapy to various antidepressants, such as clomipramine and the selective serotonin reuptake inhibitors (SSRIs), in the treatment of depression and obsessive–compulsive disorder (OCD).

== Medical uses ==
Pindolol is used for hypertension in the United States, Canada, and Europe, and also for angina pectoris outside the United States. When used alone for hypertension, pindolol can significantly lower blood pressure and heart rate, but the evidence base for its use is weak as the number of subjects in published studies is small. In some countries, pindolol is also used for arrhythmias and prophylaxis of acute stress reactions. It has been used to treat anxiety as well.

== Contraindications ==
Similar to propranolol with an extra contraindication for hyperthyroidism. In patients with thyrotoxicosis, possible deleterious effects from long-term use of pindolol have not been adequately appraised. Beta-blockade may mask the clinical signs of continuing hyperthyroidism or complications, and give a false impression of improvement. Therefore, abrupt withdrawal of pindolol may be followed by an exacerbation of the symptoms of hyperthyroidism, including thyroid storm.

Pindolol has intrinsic sympathomimetic activity and is therefore used with caution in angina pectoris.

== Interactions ==
Pindolol has been found to robustly potentiate the effects of the serotonergic psychedelic dimethyltryptamine (DMT). This is thought to be due to its serotonin 5-HT_{1A} receptor antagonism, which is thought to disinhibit the effects of DMT.

== Pharmacology ==
=== Pharmacodynamics ===
Pindolol
Site	K_{i} (nM)	Species	Ref
5-HT_{1A}	15–81	Human	
5-HT_{1B}	4,100; 34–151	Human; Rodent	
5-HT_{1D}	4,900	Human	
5-HT_{1E}	>10,000	Human	
5-HT_{1F}	>10,000	Human	
5-HT_{2A}	9,333	Human	
5-HT_{2B}	2,188	Human	
5-HT_{2C}	>10,000	Human	
5-HT_{3}	≥6,610	Multiple	
5-HT_{4}	>10,000 ?	Rat	
5-HT_{5B}	>1,000	Rat	
5-HT_{6}	>10,000 (–)	Mouse	
5-HT_{7}	>10,000	Human	
α_{1}	7,585	Pigeon	
α_{2}	ND	ND	ND
β_{1}	0.52–2.6	Human	
β_{2}	0.40–4.8	Human	
β_{3}	44	Human	
D_{2}-like	>10,000	Rat	
D_{2}	>10,000	Pigeon	
D_{3}	>10,000	Pigeon	
M_{1}	?	?	
Values are K_{i} (nM), unless otherwise noted. The smaller the value, the more strongly the drug binds to the site.

Pindolol is a first generation, non-selective beta blocker in the class of β-adrenergic receptor antagonists. On the receptor level it is a competitive partial agonist. It possesses intrinsic sympathomimetic activity, meaning it has some degree of agonist effects in the absence of competing ligands. Pindolol shows membrane-stabilizing effects like quinidine, possibly accounting for its antiarrhythmic effects. It also acts as a serotonin 5-HT_{1A} receptor partial agonist (intrinsic activity = 20–25%) or functional antagonist. The drug additionally shows affinity for the serotonin 5-HT_{1B} receptor.

=== Pharmacokinetics ===
Pindolol is rapidly and well-absorbed from the gastrointestinal tract. It undergoes some first-pass metabolism leading to an oral bioavailability of 50 to 95%. Patients with uremia may have a reduced bioavailability. Food does not alter the bioavailability, but may increase the resorption. Following an oral single dose of 20 mg peak plasma concentrations are reached within 1 to 2 hours. The effect of pindolol on pulse rate (lowering) is evident after 3 hours.

The drug's volume of distribution is 1.2 to 2 L/kg. The plasma protein binding is 40 to 60%. It crosses the blood–brain barrier and can produce centrally mediated side effects. Despite being moderately lipophilic, pindolol showed greater electroencephalogram (EEG) changes than the highly lipophilic propranolol. As a result, lipophilicity does not appear to be the sole determinant of blood–brain barrier permeability of beta blockers.

Approximately two-thirds of pindolol is metabolized in the liver giving hydroxylates, which are found in the urine as gluconurides and ethereal sulfates. The remaining one-third of pindolol is excreted in urine in unchanged form.

Despite the rather short elimination half-life of 3 to 4 hours, hemodynamic effects persist for 24 hours after administration. The half-life is increased to 3 to 11.5 hours in patients with renal impairment, to 7 to 15 hours in elderly patients, and from 2.5 to 30 hours in patients with liver cirrhosis.

== Chemistry ==
The experimental log P of pindolol is 1.75 to 1.9. It is a moderately lipophilic beta blocker.

== History ==
Pindolol was patented by Sandoz in 1969 and was launched in the US in 1977. Towards end of February 2020 FDA added this product to their "DRUG SHORTAGE" list stating this is due to "Shortage of an active ingredient" and this is likely to be related to Coronavirus outbreak and related supply chain impacts.

== Research ==
=== Depression ===
Pindolol has been investigated as an add-on drug to antidepressant therapy with SSRIs like fluoxetine in the treatment of depression since 1994. The rationale behind this strategy has its basis in the fact that pindolol is an antagonist of the serotonin 5-HT_{1A} receptor. Presynaptic and somatodendritic 5-HT_{1A} receptors act as inhibitory autoreceptors, inhibit serotonin release, and are pro-depressive in their action. This is in contrast to postsynaptic 5-HT_{1A} receptors, which mediate antidepressant effects. By blocking 5-HT_{1A} autoreceptors at doses that are selective for them over postsynaptic 5-HT_{1A} receptors, pindolol may be able to disinhibit serotonin release and thereby improve the antidepressant effects of SSRIs and clomipramine. The results of augmentation therapy with pindolol have been encouraging in early studies of low quality. A 2015 systematic review and meta-analysis of five randomized controlled trials found no overall significant benefit at 2.5 mg although, with regard to patients with SSRI-resistant depression, "once-daily high-dose pindolol (7.5 mg qd) appears to show a promising benefit in these patients". On the other hand, a 2017 systematic review indicated that pindolol's efficacy has been demonstrated in high evidence studies. Initiating pharmacotherapy with an SSRI plus pindolol might accelerate the SSRI's therapeutic impact. Pindolol's antidepressive efficacy may predominantly result from its ability to desensitize 5-HT_{1A} autoreceptors.

== See also ==
- Bopindolol
