= Reflex seizure =

- Specialty: Neurology
- Symptoms: Seizures due to a specific trigger
- Treatment: Decreasing exposure to triggers, anti-epileptic medications
- Frequency: Relatively rare

Reflex seizures are epileptic seizures that are consistently induced by a specific stimulus or trigger, making them distinct from other epileptic seizures, which are usually unprovoked. Reflex seizures are otherwise similar to unprovoked seizures and may be focal (simple or complex), generalized, myoclonic, or absence seizures. Epilepsy syndromes characterized by repeated reflex seizures are known as reflex epilepsies. Photosensitive seizures are often myoclonic, absence, or focal seizures in the occipital lobe, while musicogenic seizures are associated with focal seizures in the temporal lobe.

Triggers may include various stimuli with the most common (75 to 80%) being flickering lights resulting in photosensitive seizures. Reflex epilepsies are generally thought to be genetic in origin. The inheritance pattern is dependent on the type of reflex epilepsy, with some types lacking specific genetic inheritance patterns. For example, photogenic epilepsy is thought to follow an autosomal dominant pattern with incomplete penetrance, while seizures triggered by proprioceptive stimuli do not follow an observable inheritance pattern. The underlying mechanism involves the stimulation of existing network of neurons by the specific trigger.

The treatment of reflex epilepsy generally involves decreasing exposure to a person's triggers as well as anti-epileptic medications. Reflex epilepsy is relatively rare, making up approximately 5% of epilepsy syndromes.

== Signs and symptoms ==
Reflex seizures can be either generalized or focal seizures or both. However, for any given stimulus there may be a large variation in the kind of elicited seizure. For example, reading epilepsy may cause myoclonic jerks in the jaw or may cause focal seizures in the regions of the brain responsible for reading. In reflex epilepsy generalized seizures are more common than focal seizures.

=== Generalized seizures ===
Generalized seizures are seizures that arise in large areas of the brain, including both hemispheres. Generalized seizures can take the form of myoclonic jerks, absences, or generalized tonic-clonic seizures. Myoclonic jerks are the most common generalized seizures seen among reflex seizures and can be located in the limbs, trunk, or in specific regions of the body (e.g., in the muscles of the jaw or the eyelids). Reflex absence seizures are also common, especially in response to certain kinds of triggering stimuli such as light, proprioceptive, cognitive, emotional, or linguistic. Generalized tonic-clonic seizures are less common and can occur independently or more commonly after a cluster of myoclonic jerks or absence seizures.

=== Focal seizures ===
Focal seizures are seizures that arise from a small area of the brain in one hemisphere. Focal seizures are divided into simple or complex focal seizures. Simple focal seizures do not involve the impairment of consciousness but instead may have motor, sensory, or autonomic manifestations. Complex focal seizures do involve impairment or loss of consciousness. Focal seizures are usually only seen in certain types of reflex epilepsies such as occipital lobe seizures in photosensitive occipital lobe epilepsies or temporal lobe seizures in musicogenic epilepsies. Focal seizures can be located only in the area of the brain responsible for the stimulus, spread to other areas of the brain, or even develop into a generalized seizure.

=== Triggers ===
Stimuli that cause reflex seizures can be categorized as either intrinsic or extrinsic. For a given person, the stimulus that triggers may be intrinsic, extrinsic, or a combination of both.

==== Extrinsic stimuli ====
Extrinsic stimuli are sensory stimuli that originate from the person's environment. Similar to intrinsic stimuli, extrinsic stimuli can be divided into two categories, either simple or complex. Examples of simple extrinsic stimuli include flashing lights or touch while complex extrinsic stimuli can include music, language, reading, or stimulation from eating. Some of the more common types of reflex epilepsy include light and music.

Photosensitive epilepsy is an abnormal sensitivity of the brain to visual stimuli and is the most common trigger in reflex seizures. Reflex seizures can be induced by both flickering or non-flicking light, television, video games, or other visual patterns. Most people who have photosensitive epilepsy are sensitive to specific patterns for visual stimuli. Visual stimuli of a particular frequency (15-25 flashes/second), wavelength (red light at 660-720 nm), and high contrast have been shown to have a higher risk of inducing seizures in people who are photosensitive. In addition, emotional excitement, fatigue, or length of exposure can all effect the risk of seizures.

Musicogenic epilepsy is a rare reflex epilepsy that is thought to be an abnormal sensitivity of the brain to musical stimuli, however, the exact mechanism of these seizures is unknown. People with musicogenic epilepsy may have seizures triggered not just by musical stimuli but also by the emotional content or memory associated with that melody or rhythm. Seizures can also be triggered when people with the condition think about certain kinds of music without actually hearing the music. In addition, musicogenic epilepsy may occur with sounds that one would not usually associate with music, the sounds of machinery for example. While certain types of music may induce a seizure in a certain person, listening to other kinds of music may prevent or terminate the epileptic activity.

==== Intrinsic stimuli ====
Intrinsic stimuli are specific actions or activities performed by the person that result in a reflex seizure. Intrinsic stimuli can be divided into two categories, either elementary or elaborate. Elementary intrinsic stimuli are usually simple motor movements while elaborate intrinsic stimuli can include emotions, thoughts, calculations or decision making.

Thinking epilepsy is a rare form of reflex epilepsy that is triggered by a specific cognitive task. This can include thinking, calculations, solving problems, abstract reasoning, or making decisions. Thinking epilepsy does not occur in response to reading, writing, or verbal communication. Reading epilepsy is recognized as another distinct kind of reflex epilepsy. Thinking epilepsy usually results in generalized seizures which manifest as bilateral monoclonus, absence seizures, or generalized tonic-clonic seizure that are preceded by myoclonic jerks.

== Cause ==
Although reflex seizures are thought to have a genetic component, the exact genes involved are unclear. As of 2016, some genes of interest include:

Inheritance patterns and genes of interests
Types	Inheritance pattern	Genes of interest
Photosensitive	Autosomal dominant	6p21 7q32 13q31 16p13
Musicogenic	None or overlaps with rare genetic epilepsies	LGI1SCN1A
Thinking	Overlaps with Idiopathic Generalized Epilepsies	None
Eating	Unknown	MECP2
Hot water	Autosomal dominant	10q21.3–q22.3 4q24–q28 Synapsin 1 GPR56
Reading	Autosomal dominant with incomplete penetrance	None
Orgasm	None	None
Movement induced	None	None
Somatosensory induced	Unknown	None

== Pathophysiology ==
Epileptic seizures occur due to changes in the brain that result in the lowering of the seizure threshold in a particular individual making that person vulnerable to recurring seizures. These changes can be a result of a structural abnormality, brain lesions, or simply a genetic disposition to seizures. In reflex epilepsy, these changes in the brain result in a small area that is capable of interrupting normal firing patterns and is more likely to produce the synchronous firing patterns that characterize a seizure. These hyper-excitable areas may then be activated by certain stimuli resulting in a reflex seizure. Reflex seizures are thus notable because the presentation of a particular stimulus, that activates the hyper-excitable areas of the brain, directly overcomes the seizure threshold, and results in a reflex seizure.

The activation of the hyper-excitable areas of the brain is additionally regulated by facilitating factors that may increase the likelihood of eliciting a seizure. Most commonly these include fatigue, sleep deprivation, or stress. Facilitating factors are different for each individual. Due to the large variance between the different kinds of reflex epilepsies, the specific mechanism causing reflex seizures may vary.

== Diagnosis ==
The diagnosis of reflex epilepsy usually includes a comprehensive medical and family history as well as a variety of tests. These tests may include a electroencephalography (EEG), magnetic resonance imaging (MRI), as well as genetic testing.

The procedure for diagnosing epilepsy generally follows three steps:

1. Determining if the seizure or seizure like event is truly an epileptic seizure.
2. Determining what kind of seizure that someone has had.
3. Determining if this seizure or seizures are a part of a specific epilepsy syndrome or disease.

== Treatment ==
The treatment of reflex epilepsy generally involves decreasing exposure to a person's triggers as well as anti-epileptic medications. Specific treatment depends both on the person as well on the kind of reflex triggers. For example, in photosensitive epilepsy, some people may rely only on managing exposure to their triggers, while others, may benefit greatly from anti-epileptic drugs. In addition, different anti-epileptic medications may be used in order to treat a given person's reflex epilepsy depending on the kind of seizures that they experience.

=== Photosensitive epilepsy ===
Photosensitive reflex epilepsy is usually treated with both lifestyle changes and anti-epileptic medications. Some lifestyle modifications that may be recommended are limiting the amount of time one is exposed to television or screens, watching television in a bright well-lit room at a distance of at least 2 meters, and avoiding television or video games when tired. LCD TV screens or Televisions with higher refresh rates (100 Hz) cause less flickering and thus lower the likelihood of a seizure. In addition, special blue lens Z1 glasses have been shown to reduce seizures in many people with photosensitive reflex epilepsy.

If the above lifestyle modifications do not manage the condition, anti-epileptic medications may also be used. Valproate is usually the first line medication of choice in people with photosensitive reflex epilepsy with many people becoming seizure free. Second line anti-epileptic medications include levetiracetam, benzodiazepines (such as clonazepam), lamotrigine, carbamazepine, brivaracetam, ethosuximide, and topiramate.

Photosensitive reflex epilepsy tends to decrease with age, especially in one's thirties. In 25-50% of people, seizures may spontaneously subside or disappear.

== Epidemiology ==
In 2015 epilepsy was present in about 1.3% of the population of the United States, approximately 3 million adults and 470,000 children. Reflex epilepsy is found in approximately 5% of people who have epilepsy. Photosensitive epilepsy is the most common type of reflex epilepsy, accounting for 75-80% of cases. In addition, reflex epilepsies may show preferential distribution between the two sexes or certain age groups. Photosensitive epilepsy, for example, is more common in females (60% of cases) and is also more common in younger people (7–19 years old).

References
Type of epilepsy	Frequency	Groups typically affected
Photosensitive	1 in 4000 people	More common in females (60%) More common in younger people
Musicogenic	1 in 10,000,000 people	No sex predominance
Thinking	Overlaps with juvenile myoclonic epilepsy	Unknown
Eating	1 in 1000-2000 of people with epilepsy	More common in males (3:1)
Hot water	Rare	More common in males (70%)
Reading	Rare	More common in males (1.8:1)
Orgasm	Rare	More common in females
Movement induced	Rare	Unknown
Somatosensory induced	Rare	Unknown

== History ==
Triggering seizures in epilepsy has been a phenomenon that has been observed since ancient times. The Apologia records instances of a spinning potter's wheel causing seizures in epileptic slaves. In 1850 Marshal Hall described the role of specific stimuli on causing seizures. Since then, many types of stimuli that can trigger seizures have been identified. The International League Against Epilepsy (ILAE) identified epilepsy caused by a specific stimuli in 1989 in their official definition of epilepsy and more recently, has updated this definition to recognize new types of focal and generalized seizures. Currently reflex epilepsies are classified as miscellaneous types of epilepsy and are identified by the type of triggering stimulus.
