= Hypertensive crisis =

Very high blood pressure

- Other names: Malignant hypertension, accelerated hypertension
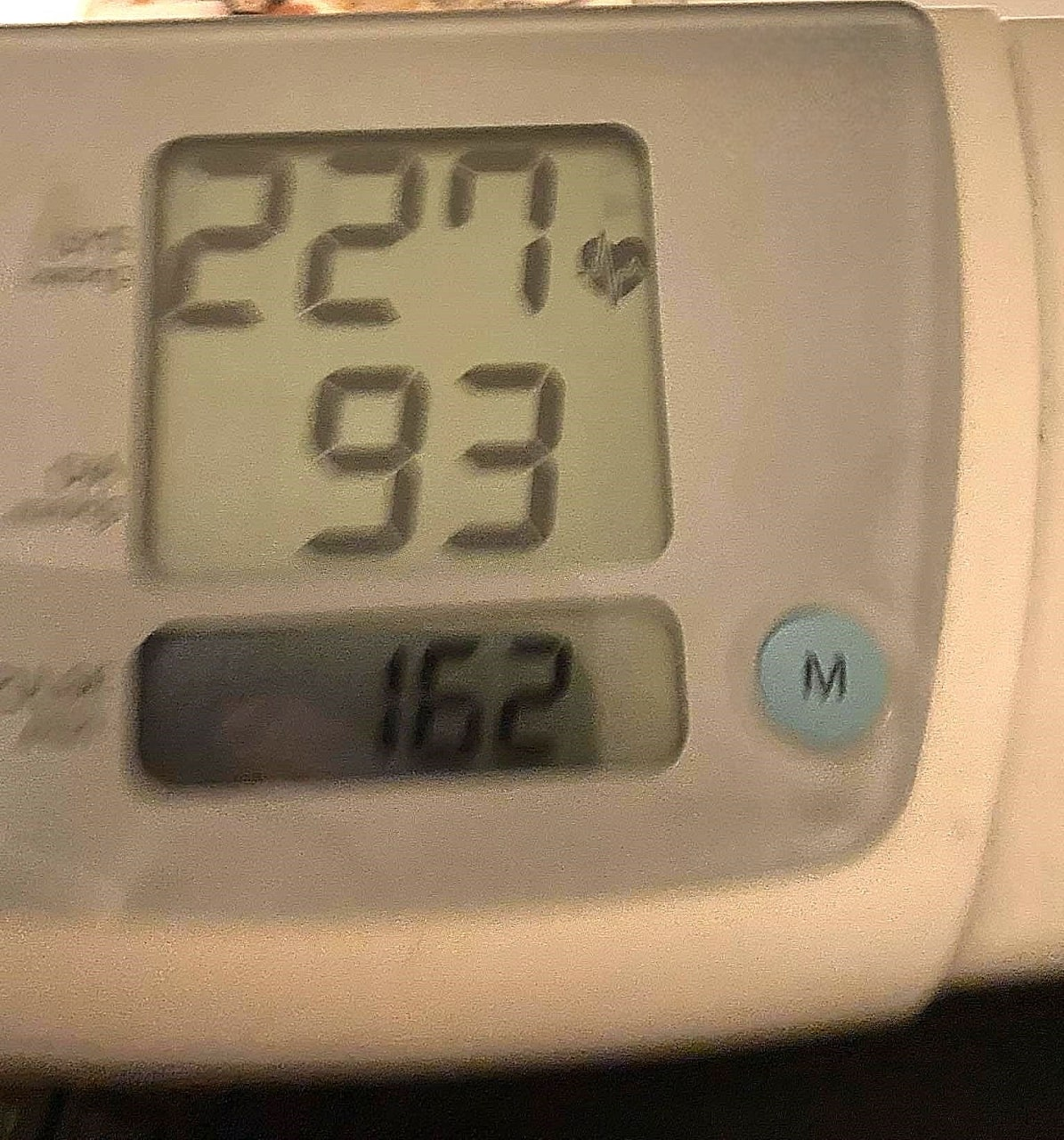
- A systolic hypertensive crisis as measured on a home automated arm blood pressure monitor, showing an extremely elevated systolic blood pressure of 227, a mildly elevated diastolic blood pressure of 93 and a very fast tachycardic heart rate of 162 beats per minute.
- Specialty: Cardiology, emergency medicine
- Symptoms: Headache, dizziness, malaise, shortness of breath; some cases asymptomatic
- Complications: Hypertensive emergency
- Treatment: Gradual reduction of blood pressure
- Medication: Antihypertensives

Severely elevated blood pressure (equal to or greater than 180 mmHg systolic or 120 mmHg diastolic) is referred to as a hypertensive crisis (sometimes termed malignant or accelerated hypertension), due to the high risk of complications. People with blood pressures in this range may have no symptoms, but are more likely to report headaches (22% of cases) and dizziness than the general population. Other symptoms accompanying a hypertensive crisis may include visual deterioration due to retinopathy, breathlessness due to heart failure, or a general feeling of malaise due to kidney failure.

Most people with a hypertensive crisis are known to have elevated blood pressure, but additional triggers may have led to a sudden rise.

== Signs and symptoms ==
A hypertensive emergency is diagnosed when there is evidence of direct damage to one or more organs as a result of severely elevated blood pressure greater than 180 mmHg systolic or 120 mmHg diastolic. This may include hypertensive encephalopathy, caused by brain swelling and dysfunction, and characterized by headaches and an altered level of consciousness (confusion or drowsiness). Retinal papilledema or fundal bleeds and exudates are another sign of target organ damage. Chest pain may indicate heart muscle damage (which may progress to myocardial infarction) or sometimes aortic dissection, the tearing of the inner wall of the aorta. Breathlessness, cough, and the coughing up of blood-stained sputum are characteristic signs of pulmonary edema, the swelling of lung tissue due to left ventricular failure, an inability of the left ventricle of the heart to adequately pump blood from the lungs into the arterial system. Rapid deterioration of kidney function (acute kidney injury) and microangiopathic hemolytic anemia (destruction of blood cells) may also occur.

== Treatment ==
Rapid reduction of the blood pressure is mandated to stop ongoing organ damage during a hypertensive crisis. There is no evidence that blood pressure needs to be lowered rapidly in hypertensive urgencies, where there is no evidence of target organ damage; over-aggressive reduction of blood pressure is not without risks. Use of oral medications to lower the BP gradually over 24 to 48 hours is advocated in hypertensive urgencies.

== Etiologies ==
There are several etiologies of a hypertensive crisis, including a tumor. A rare, neuroendocrine tumor called a pheochromocytoma can cause a hypertensive crisis due to elevated levels of catecholamines.
