= Photic stimulation =

Photic stimulation may refer to:

- Intermittent photic stimulation as diagnostic procedure
- Any stimulation involving photons
