= Seizure threshold =

Glutamatergic and GABAergic balance in the brain that affects seizure susceptibility

The term seizure threshold is used to describe the balance between excitatory (glutaminergic) and inhibitory (GABA-ergic) forces in the brain which affect how susceptible a person is to seizures. Those diagnosed with epilepsy or certain other neurological conditions are more vulnerable to seizures if the threshold is reduced, and should be compliant with their anticonvulsant drug regimen.

Medications that lower seizure threshold include the antidepressant and nicotinic antagonist bupropion, the atypical opioid analgesics tramadol and tapentadol, reserpine, theophylline, antibiotics (fluoroquinolones, imipenem, penicillins, cephalosporins, metronidazole, isoniazid) and volatile anesthetics. So can other factors, including:

- sleep deprivation
- illicit drug use, such as cocaine
- withdrawal from drugs or certain stimuli
- fever
- exposure to flashing or flickering lights (photosensitive epilepsy) including neon lights, strobe lights, video games or even patterns like narrow stripes
- lengthy periods of fasting, malnutrition, starvation, high stress, fear, fatigue and exhaustion
- menstruation
- uncontrolled diabetes, and
- other endocrine and metabolic irregularities like electrolyte or hormonal imbalances (for example, metabolic alkalosis)

Cancer and certain disorders of the nervous, cardiovascular and gastrointestinal systems can also influence the severity and frequency of seizures.

== See also ==
- Seizure trigger
