= Reading epilepsy =

Type of a reflex seizure

Reading epilepsy is a type of a reflex seizure caused by reading.

Reading epilepsy is one of a number of reflex seizures. The reflex seizures are characterized by epileptic seizures occurring due to reflex, i.e. caused by a specific stimulus, contrary to other epilepsy types with spontaneous seizures. In discussed case reading becomes a trigger, as loud reading as a quiet one. In effect seizure can occur, including oral area myoclonus, especially affecting masseter muscle, orbicularis oris muscle, oral and perioral myoclonus. Extremities can be affected too. Apart from that, affected person can be unable to read. EEG performed during the seizure complexes of sharp waves and slow waves from a dominant hemisphere, especially from a temporoparietal area, can be observed. However, between the seizures no electroencephalographic changes can be detected. There is no lesion observable in the head MRI either.

Reading epilepsy occurs more frequently in boys aged from 12 to 20 years. A genetic base is suspected.

In the case of reading epilepsy a change of reading manner is recommended as a prevention. Koutroumanidis et al. (1998) described a case series, in which they administered anticolvulsive medicines. The seizure disappeared in 9 patients of 14. Clonazepam was proved effective drug when valproic acid did not act in some patients.
