= Musicogenic epilepsy =

- Specialty: Neurology

Musicogenic epilepsy is a form of reflex epilepsy with seizures elicited by special stimuli.

It was probably described for the first time in 1605 by the French philosopher and scholar Joseph Justus Scaliger (1540-1609). Later publications were, in the eighteenth century, among others, by the German physician Samuel Schaarschmidt, in the nineteenth century 1823 by the British physician John C. Cooke, 1881 by the British neurologist and epileptologist William Richard Gowers, as well as in 1913 by the Russian neurologist, clinical neurophysiologist and psychiatrist Vladimir Mikhailovich Bekhterev. In 1937 the British neurologist Macdonald Critchley coined the term for the first time and classified it as a form of reflex epilepsy.

Most patients have temporal lobe epilepsy. Listening, probably also thinking or playing, of usually very specific music with an emotional content triggers focal seizures with or without loss of awareness, occasionally also evolving to bilateral tonic-clonic seizures.

Although musicality is at least in non-musicians predominantly located in the right temporal lobe, the seizure onset may also be left-hemispherical. Of the approximately 100 patients reported in the literature so far, about 75% had temporal lobe epilepsy, women were slightly more affected, and the mean age of onset was about 28 years. Ictal EEG and SPECT findings as well as functional MRI studies localized the epileptogenic area predominantly in the right temporal lobe. Treatment with epilepsy surgery leading to complete seizure freedom has been reported.

== See also ==
- Music-specific disorders
- Musicogenic seizure
- Musicophilia: Tales of Music and the Brain
