= Intermittent photic stimulation =

Neuroimaging technique

In medicine, intermittent photic stimulation, or IPS, is a form of visual stimulation used in conjunction with electroencephalography to investigate anomalous brain activity triggered by specific visual stimuli, such as flashing lights or patterns.

IPS and EEGs are often used to diagnose conditions such as photosensitive epilepsy. The field is relatively new and the details of use of IPS have not been widely standardized. IPS is often used in conjunction with other controllable generators of visual stimuli, such as low-level visual stimulation LLVS.

Photic stimulation may also be used to elicit myoclonus, especially cortical reflex myoclonus when present in photo-sensitive forms.

IPS may be used to stimulate the visual system for patients with amblyopia. This system uses a visual stimulus that is usually red in color with a frequency of about 4 Hz to stimulate the neural pathway between the retina and the visual cortex. The objective is to improve the visual acuity of an amblyopic (lazy) eye.
