= Hypertensive encephalopathy =

Brain dysfunction due to very high blood pressure

- Specialty: Emergency medicine, Cardiology, Neurology
- Symptoms: Headache, vomiting, trouble with balance, confusion
- Complications: Seizures, bleeding in the back of the eye
- Usual onset: Sudden
- Causes: Kidney failure, rapidly stopping blood pressure medication, pheochromocytoma, taking monoamine oxidase inhibitor with foods containing tyramine, eclampsia
- Diagnostic method: Blood pressure > 200/130 mmHg and general brain dysfunction
- Differential diagnosis: Uremic encephalopathy, stroke (ischemic or bleeding), hydrocephalus, cocaine toxicity
- Medication: Labetalol, sodium nitroprusside
- Frequency: Uncommon

Hypertensive encephalopathy (HE) is general brain dysfunction due to significantly high blood pressure. Symptoms may include headache, vomiting, trouble with balance, and confusion. Onset is generally sudden. Complications can include seizures, posterior reversible encephalopathy syndrome, and bleeding in the back of the eye.

In hypertensive encephalopathy, generally the blood pressure is greater than 200/130 mmHg. Occasionally it can occur at a BP as low as 160/100 mmHg. This can occur in kidney failure, those who rapidly stop blood pressure medication, pheochromocytoma, and people on a monoamine oxidase inhibitor (MAOI) who eat foods with tyramine. When it occurs in pregnancy it is known as eclampsia. The diagnosis requires ruling out other possible causes.

The condition is generally treated with medications to relatively rapidly lower the blood pressure. This may be done with labetalol or sodium nitroprusside given by injection into a vein. In those who are pregnant, magnesium sulfate may be used. Other treatments may include anti-seizure medications.

Hypertensive encephalopathy is uncommon. It is believed to occur more often in those without easy access to health care. The term was first used by Oppenheimer and Fishberg in 1928. It is classified as a type of hypertensive emergency.

== Signs and symptoms ==
Hypertensive encephalopathy is most commonly encountered in young and middle-aged people who have hypertension. Overall, the condition is rare even among people with hypertension. Studies report that from 0.5 to 15% of people with malignant hypertension develop hypertensive encephalopathy. With the development of methods for detection and treatment of hypertension, hypertensive encephalopathy has been becoming more rare.

Symptoms of hypertensive encephalopathy typically start to occur 12–48 hours after a sudden and sustained increase in blood pressure. The first manifestation of these symptoms is a severe headache. Headache occurs in greater than 75% of patients. The patient becomes restless. Alterations in consciousness may follow several hours later, which include impaired judgement and memory, confusion, somnolence and stupor. If the condition is not treated, these neurological symptoms may worsen and ultimately turn into a coma. Other symptoms may include increased irritability, vomiting, diplopia, seizures, twitching and myoclonus of the limbs. Alterations in vision (vision blurring, hemivisual field defects, color blindness, cortical blindness) are common. They occur in 4 out of 11 cases (Jellinek et al. 1964). Hemiparesis, intracerebral hemorrhage, aphasia may also occur, but they are less common.

== Pathogenesis ==
Hypertensive encephalopathy is caused by an increase in blood pressure. Several conditions may evoke blood pressure elevation: acute nephritis, eclampsia, crises in chronic essential hypertension, sudden withdrawal of antihypertensive treatment. Additionally, hypertensive encephalopathy may occur in pheochromocytoma, Cushing's syndrome, renal artery thrombosis.

The impairment of cerebral blood flow that underlies hypertensive encephalopathy is still controversial. Normally, cerebral blood flow is maintained by an autoregulation mechanism that dilates arterioles in response to blood pressure decreases and constricts arterioles in response to blood pressure increases. This autoregulation falters when hypertension becomes excessive. According to the over-regulation conception, brain vessels spasm in response to acute hypertension, which results in cerebral ischemia and cytotoxic edema. According to the autoregulation breakthrough conception, cerebral arterioles are forced to dilate, leading to vasogenic edema.

Cerebral edema can be generalized or focal. Brain ventricles are compressed, cortical gyri flattened.

== Diagnosis ==
Diagnostic methods for hypertensive encephalopathy include physical examination, blood pressure measurement, blood sampling, ECG, EEG, chest X-ray, urinalysis, arterial blood gas analysis, and imaging of the head (CAT scan and/or MRI). Since decreasing blood pressure is essential, anti-hypertensive medication is administered without awaiting the results of the laboratory tests. Electroencephalographic examination detects the absence of alpha waves, signifying impaired consciousness. In people with visual disturbances, slow waves are detected in the occipital areas.

== Treatment ==
The initial aim of treatment in hypertensive crises is to rapidly lower the diastolic pressure to about 100 to 105 mmHg; this goal should be achieved within two to six hours, with the maximum initial fall in BP not exceeding 25 percent of the presenting value. This level of BP control will allow gradual healing of the necrotizing vascular lesions. More aggressive hypotensive therapy is both unnecessary and may reduce the blood pressure below the autoregulatory range, possibly leading to ischemic events (such as stroke or coronary disease).

Once the BP is controlled, the person should be switched to medication by mouth, with the diastolic pressure being gradually reduced to 85 to 90 mmHg over two to three months. The initial reduction to a diastolic pressure of approximately 100 mmHg is often associated with a modest worsening of renal function; this change, however, is typically transient as the vascular disease tends to resolve and renal perfusion improves over one to three months. Antihypertensive therapy should not be withheld in this setting unless there has been an excessive reduction in BP. A change in medication, however, is indicated if the decline in renal function is temporally related to therapy with an angiotensin (ACE) converting enzyme inhibitor or angiotensin II receptor blocker, which can interfere with renal autoregulation and produce acute kidney failure in patients with bilateral renal artery stenosis. (See "Renal effects of ACE inhibitors in hypertension".)ref

Several parenteral antihypertensive agents are most often used in the initial treatment of malignant hypertension.

- Nitroprusside – an arteriolar and venous dilator, given as an intravenous infusion. Nitroprusside acts within seconds and has a duration of action of only two to five minutes. Thus, hypotension can be easily reversed by temporarily discontinuing the infusion, providing an advantage over the drugs listed below. However, the potential for cyanide toxicity limits the prolonged use of nitroprusside, particularly in patients with chronic kidney disease.
- Nicardipine – an arteriolar dilator, given as an intravenous infusion.
- Clevidipine – a short-acting dihydropyridine calcium channel blocker. It reduces blood pressure without affecting cardiac filling pressures or causing reflex tachycardia.
- Labetalol – an alpha- and beta-adrenergic blocker, given as an intravenous bolus or infusion. Bolus followed by infusion.
- Fenoldopam – a peripheral dopamine-1 receptor agonist, given as an intravenous infusion.
- Oral agents — A slower onset of action and an inability to control the degree of BP reduction has limited the use of oral antihypertensive agents in the therapy of hypertensive crises. They may, however, be useful when there is no rapid access to the parenteral medications described above. Both sublingual nifedipine and sublingual captopril can substantially lower the BP within 10 to 30 minutes in many patients. A more rapid response is seen when liquid nifedipine is swallowed.

The major risk with oral agents is ischemic symptoms (e.g., angina pectoris, myocardial infarction, or stroke) due to an excessive and uncontrolled hypotensive response. Thus, their use should generally be avoided in the treatment of hypertensive crises if more controllable drugs are available.

== Prognosis ==
Patients with hypertensive encephalopathy who are promptly treated usually recover without deficit. However, if treatment is not administered, the condition can lead to death.

== History ==
The first descriptions of the condition date back to the early 1900s. In 1914, Volhard and Fahr distinguished a neurological disorder caused by acute hypertension from a uremic state. He described this condition a "pseudouremia". The term "hypertensive encephalopathy" was introduced by Oppenheimer and Fishberg in 1928 to describe the case of a patient with acute nephritis, severe hypertension, and cerebral symptoms.

In the past, the term "hypertensive encephalopathy" has been applied to a range of neurological problems occurring in hypertensive patients, such as headache, dizziness cerebral hemorrhage and transient ischemic attacks. However, currently this term is narrowed down to a clinical condition produced by elevated blood pressure and which can be reversed by blood pressure reduction.
