= Musicogenic seizure =

Rare type of seziure

Musicogenic seizure, also known as music-induced seizure, is a rare type of seizure, with an estimated prevalence of 1 in 10,000,000 individuals, that arises from disorganized or abnormal brain electrical activity when a person hears or is exposed to a specific type of sound or musical stimulus. There are challenges when diagnosing a music-induced seizure due to the broad scope of triggers, and time delay between a stimulus and seizure. In addition, the causes of musicogenic seizures are not well-established as solely limited cases and research have been discovered and conducted respectively. Nevertheless, the current understanding of the mechanism behind musicogenic seizure is that music triggers the part of the brain that is responsible for evoking an emotion associated with that music. Dysfunction in this system leads to an abnormal release of dopamine, eventually inducing seizure.

Currently, there are diverse intervention strategies that patients can choose from depending on their situations. They can have surgery to remove the region of the brain that generates a seizure. Behavioral therapy is also available; patients are trained to gain emotional control to reduce the frequency of seizure. Medications like carbamazepine and phenytoin (medication for general seizure) also suggest effectiveness to mitigate music-induced seizures.

== Signs & symptoms ==
While the signs and symptoms of musicogenic seizures are similar to that of other focal seizures, one unique distinction is the variation in the time interval between the stimulus and seizure among different patients. Unlike most focal seizures, the duration between the triggering musical stimulus and seizure varies among patients; some patients encounter the seizure imminently after the trigger, while some experience a wide time gap between the stimulus and seizure. During this latent prolonged time lapse, the symptoms experienced are autonomic responses. Patients may encounter changes in respiratory rate, blood pressure, and heart rate such as tachycardia, leading them to feel distressed and agitated.

Furthermore, hallucinations are often experienced when encountering a seizure triggered by a musical stimulus. For example, musical release hallucinations and synesthetic experiences are the most common hallucinations associated with music-induced seizures. Musical auditory hallucinations may also develop due to epilepsy in the temporal lobe, which is found to be affected in 75% cases of musicogenic seizures.

== Causes ==
Musicogenic seizures are generally defined as a focal seizure, as the lateral and mesial temporal, and orbitofrontal areas of the brain are affected. Musicogenic seizures have complex stimuli due to the broad scope of possibilities of triggers.

A wide spectrum of triggers has been noted to stimulate musicogenic seizures and musicogenic epilepsy as the type of music and method of perceiving music varies from one patient to another. It has been reported that 17% of music-evoked seizures are induced solely by music, while 53% are induced by miscellaneous musical stimuli. Examples of musical triggers not only include listening to noise, sound, volume, pure words, genre, singer, song, and anthem, but also playing, thinking and dreaming of music. Among these triggers, most patients tend to be triggered by a specific tune, song or singer. Musical characteristics such as cadence, frequency, and timbre are possible reasoning behind the musical stimuli. Hence, this proposes that a particular rhythmic activity or pattern induces a seizure.

== Mechanism ==
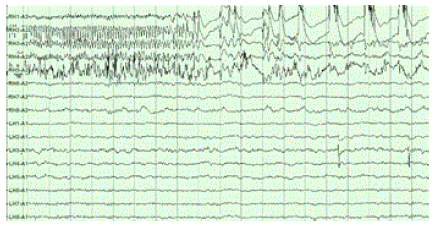
An electroencephalogram (EEG) of the mesial temporal lobe of a patient in seizure.

Although the understanding of the exact causes of musicogenic seizures is currently not fully known, a commonly understood mechanism is that this epilepsy is associated with emotional responses to music rather than the music itself. Specifically, music creates an emotional response that is activated by the limbic areas. This emotional effect of the music then triggers the increase of dopamine in the different parts of the brain, eventually leading to hyperexcitation, which is an abnormal excitation of neurons, and generation of seizures in those areas when there is a dysfunction in this system.

This notion is supported by many functional imaging studies like fMRI, PET scan, and clinical studies which suggested that patients of the musicogenic seizure often express emotional feelings before the onset of the seizure.

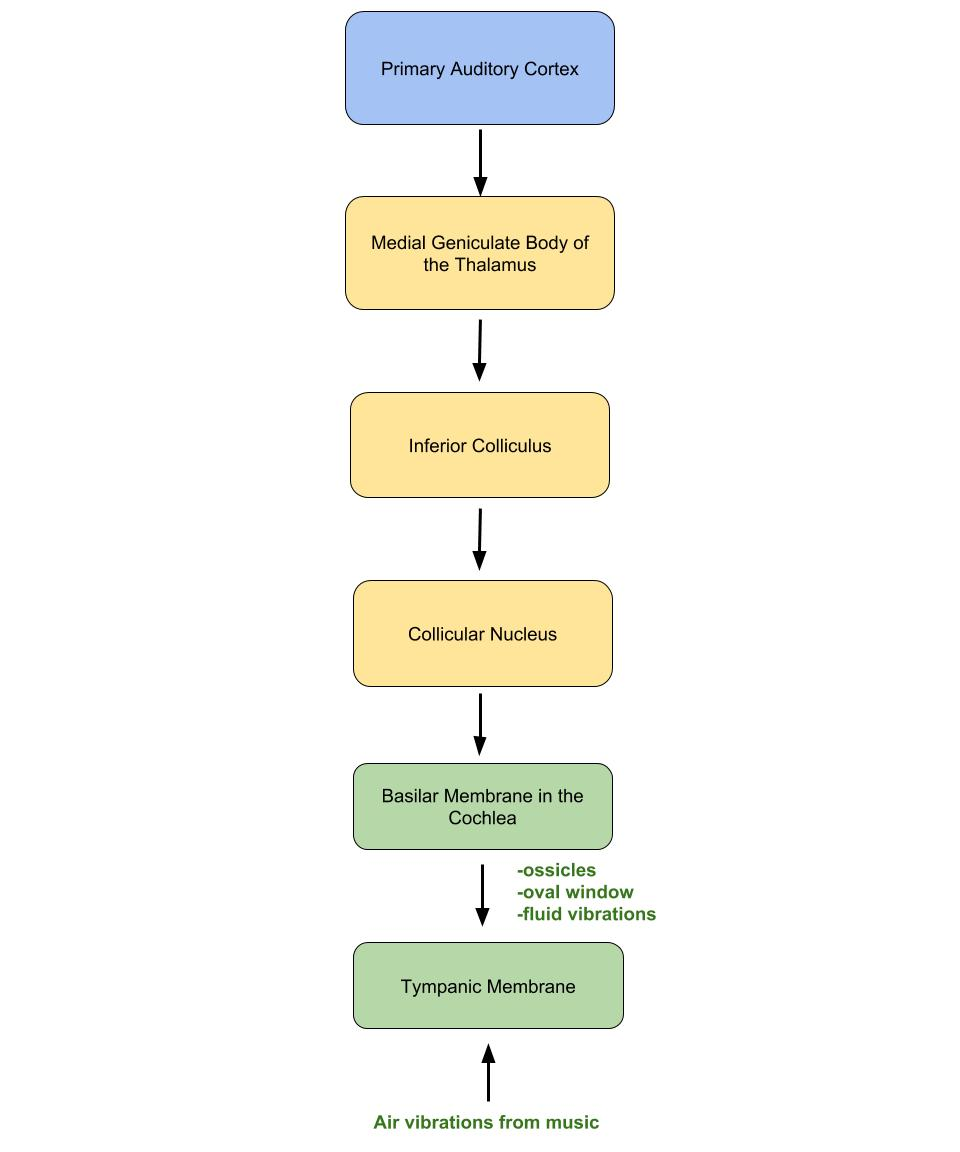
Fig.1 A diagram that shows the process involved in the auditory sensory relay from air vibrations from music to the primary auditory cortex

=== Emotional associations of music ===
The general relationship of the association between emotion and music is that after the auditory sensory relay of the musical information to the primary auditory cortex (shown in figure 1), the hippocampal connection in the brain encodes the association of positive/negative emotions with certain music in the memory. Given this memory, when a person receives musical information from the environment, the hippocampus relays the emotional information related to that music to the mesolimbic system, which regulates the association of emotion and dopamine release.

These connections between the hippocampus, mesolimbic system, and auditory cortex provide a possible mechanism of music-induced seizure by helping the brain to relate music to emotion and dopamine release. Dysfunction in this sensory relay network leads to an abnormal release of dopamine, eventually inducing hyperexcitability of neurons and seizure when certain music is heard. Moreover, scientists discovered that there are other parts of the brain like basolateral amygdala involved in this connection between music, emotion, and seizure. Hence, this suggests that the mechanism behind musicogenic seizure still remains obscure and more research is required to fully understand it.

== Diagnosis ==
The diagnoses of music-induced seizures are complicated as the nature of stimulus is relatively unique in the ambit of seizure triggers. The usual diagnosis of seizures is routinely carried out through electroencephalography (EEG), physical examination and a review of patient history. However, an EEG may not be appropriate to diagnose and test a person with music-evoked seizures since EEG is used to test photosensitive epilepsy, a form of epilepsy where seizures are stimulated by light. While an EEG typically tests varied frequencies of a light stimulus, musicogenic seizures are stimulated differently by music.

Moreover, there may be a time period delay between the music or sound stimulus received and seizure triggered. The time gap between the stimulus and the response heightens the challenge of diagnoses. Recent hypotheses recommended testing routine electroencephalography (REEG) or amplitude-integrated electroencephalography (AEEG) to test music-evoked seizures. However, further obstacles arise in deducing the type of sound, song, and style of music which affects the patients with musicogenic seizures. There is a large range of possible sounds that may trigger musicogenic seizures, such as church bells, a song associated with nostalgia, dissonant sounds, and classical music.

== Treatment ==
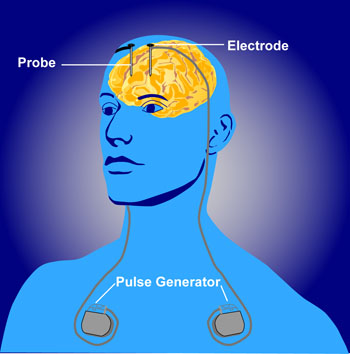
Illustration of deep brain stimulation

Once the patient is diagnosed with the disease, there are diverse interventions that patients can choose from including surgical, behavioral, and medicinal treatments.

=== Surgery ===
Surgical intervention is suitable for patients with refractory epilepsy. Specifically, the patients undergo partial resectioning of the part of the brain that generates a seizure. This region is identified by imaging techniques like EEG.

For patients who are not suitable to undergo a resectioning treatment, deep brain stimulation and vagus nerve stimulation may be effective alternatives; however, results suggest that it is often difficult for both deep brain and vagus nerve stimulation to completely stop seizures.

=== Behavioral therapy ===
Behavioral or psychotherapeutic interventions may be effective in treating musicogenic epilepsy. These therapies work by helping patients gain emotional control and thereby reducing the frequency of seizure. In fact, many patients often assert that their seizures are stopped after this behavioral therapy.

Structural formula of carbamazepine, a commonly used medication for epilepsy treatment.

=== Medicine ===
Many pharmacological interventions have shown positive results. Often carbamazepine, phenytoin, and lamotrigine, commonly used for general epilepsy treatment, are prescribed to patients with music-induced seizure. In some patients, these medications show better results when combined with oxcarbazepine, sodium valproate, or levetiracetam, which are also other medications for general epilepsy treatment.

== Epidemiology ==
Globally, epilepsy and seizures are among the most severe of the common neurological disorders . Active epilepsy, defined as people who have continuing seizures or require treatment, can be found in 4-10 individuals per 1000 worldwide. A higher prevalence has been reported in low-income and middle-income countries at 7 to 15 cases of active epilepsy per 1000 individuals. Musicogenic epilepsy is a rare subtype of these, with an estimated prevalence of 1 in 10,000,000 individuals.

The actual prevalence is perceived to be greater than reported. Due to the limited number of reported cases, insufficient research has been conducted on musicogenic seizures and musicogenic epilepsy. It has been suggested that the disorder has a higher tendency to affect females, while the average age of onset is 28. Nonetheless, the age of presentation is usually at 39, therefore suggesting an underestimated prevalence. Moreover, the underestimated prevalence of musicogenic seizures could also be due to challenges in diagnosis such as deducing music as a seizure trigger.
