= Labetalol =

Medication used to treat high blood pressure

Clinical data
- Pronunciation: /ləˈbɛtəlɔːl/
- Trade names: Normodyne, Trandate, others
- Other names: Ibidomide; AH-5158; SCH-19927
- AHFS/Drugs.com: Monograph
- MedlinePlus: a685034
- License data: US DailyMed: Labetalol
- Pregnancy category: AU: C
- Routes of administration: By mouth, intravenous
- ATC code: C07AG01 (WHO)

Legal status
- Legal status: AU: S4 (Prescription only); In general: ℞ (Prescription only)

Pharmacokinetic data
- Bioavailability: 25% (11–86%)
- Protein binding: 50%
- Metabolism: Mainly conjugation via glucuronidation
- Metabolites: • Glucuronide conjugates
- Elimination half-life: Oral: 6–8 hours IV: 5.52 hours
- Duration of action: 8–12 hours
- Excretion: Urine (55–60% as conjugates or unchanged within 24 hours)

Identifiers
- IUPAC name: (RS)-2-Hydroxy-5-[1-hydroxy-2-[(4-phenylbutan-2-yl)amino]ethyl]benzamide
- CAS Number: 36894-69-6
- PubChem CID: 3869
- IUPHAR/BPS: 7207
- DrugBank: DB00598
- ChemSpider: 3734
- UNII: R5H8897N95
- KEGG: D08106; as HCl: D00600
- ChEBI: CHEBI:6343
- ChEMBL: ChEMBL429
- CompTox Dashboard (EPA): DTXSID2023191
- ECHA InfoCard: 100.048.401

Chemical and physical data
- Formula: C_{19}H_{24}N_{2}O_{3}
- Molar mass: 328.412 g·mol^{−1}
- 3D model (JSmol): Interactive image
- Chirality: Racemic mixture
- SMILES: c1ccccc1CCC(C)NCC(O)c2ccc(O)c(C(=O)N)c2
- InChI: InChI=1S/C19H24N2O3/c1-13(7-8-14-5-3-2-4-6-14)21-12-18(23)15-9-10-17(22)16(11-15)19(20)24/h2-6,9-11,13,18,21-23H,7-8,12H2,1H3,(H2,20,24); Key:SGUAFYQXFOLMHL-UHFFFAOYSA-N

Labetalol is a medication used to treat high blood pressure and in long term management of angina. This includes essential hypertension, hypertensive emergencies, and hypertension of pregnancy. In essential hypertension it is generally less preferred than a number of other blood pressure medications. It can be given by mouth or by injection into a vein.

Common side effects include low blood pressure with standing, dizziness, feeling tired, and nausea. Serious side effects may include low blood pressure, liver problems, heart failure, and bronchospasm. Use appears safe in the latter part of pregnancy and it is not expected to cause problems during breastfeeding. It works by blocking the activation of β- and α-adrenergic receptors.

Labetalol was patented in 1966 and came into medical use in 1977. It is available as a generic medication. In 2023, it was the 232nd most commonly prescribed medication in the United States, with more than 1 million prescriptions.

== Medical uses ==
Labetalol is effective in the management of hypertensive emergencies, postoperative hypertension, pheochromocytoma-associated hypertension, and rebound hypertension from beta blocker withdrawal.

It has a particular indication in the treatment of pregnancy-induced hypertension which is commonly associated with pre-eclampsia.

It is also used as an alternative in the treatment of severe hypertension.

Labetalol is useful in the treatment of acute cardiovascular toxicity (e.g. in overdose) caused by sympathomimetics like amphetamine, methamphetamine, cocaine, ephedrine, and pseudoephedrine. Other beta blockers are also used. However, the controversial yet possible phenomenon of "unopposed α-stimulation" with administration of selective beta blockers to block non-selective sympathomimetics potentially makes dual alpha-1 and beta blockers like labetalol and carvedilol more favorable for such purposes. The rate of unopposed α-stimulation with selective beta blockers has been reported to be 0.4%, whereas no cases of unopposed α-stimulation have been reported with dual alpha and beta blockers like labetalol.

=== Special populations ===
Pregnancy: studies in lab animals showed no harm to the baby. However, a comparable well-controlled study has not been performed in pregnant women.

Nursing: breast milk has been shown to contain small amounts of labetalol (0.004% original dose). Prescribers should be cautious in the use of labetalol for nursing mothers.

Pediatric: no studies have established safety or usefulness in this population.

Geriatric: Due to an increased likelihood of experiencing orthostatic symptoms such as dizziness, product labelling recommends that elderly patients receive counselling regarding these side effects during labetalol treatment. Furthermore, because drug elimination is reduced in older demographics, lower maintenance doses are typically sufficient to achieve therapeutic effects.

== Contraindications ==
Labetalol is contraindicated in people with overt cardiac failure, greater-than-first-degree heart block, severe bradycardia, cardiogenic shock, severe hypotension, anyone with a history of obstructive airway disease including asthma, and those with hypersensitivity to the drug.

== Side effects ==
=== Common ===
- Neurologic: headache (2%), dizziness (11%)
- Gastrointestinal: nausea (6%), dyspepsia (3%)
- Cholinergic: nasal congestion (3%), ejaculation failure (2%)
- Respiratory: dyspnea (2%)
- Other: fatigue (5%), vertigo (2%), orthostatic hypotension

Low blood pressure with standing is more severe and more common with IV formulation (58% vs 1%) and is often the reason larger doses of the oral formulation cannot be used.

=== Rare ===
- Fever
- Muscle cramps
- Dry eyes
- Heart block
- Hyperkalemia
- Hepatotoxicity
- Drug eruption similar to lichen planus
- Hypersensitivity – which may result in a lethal respiratory distress

== Pharmacology ==
=== Mechanism of action ===
Labetalol is a beta blocker, or an antagonist of the β-adrenergic receptors. It is specifically a non-selective antagonist of the β_{1}- and β_{2}-adrenergic receptors. Labetalol has intrinsic sympathomimetic activity. It is also an antagonist of the α_{1}-adrenergic receptor, and hence is additionally an alpha blocker. The antagonism of the adrenergic receptors by labetalol is competitive against other catecholamines and its actions on the receptors are potent and reversible. Labetalol acts by blocking α- and β-adrenergic receptors, resulting in decreased peripheral vascular resistance without significant alteration of heart rate or cardiac output.

Labetalol is about equipotent in blocking β_{1}- and β_{2}-adrenergic receptors. The amount of α to β blockade depends on whether labetalol is administered orally or intravenously (IV). Orally, the ratio of α to β blockade is 1:3. Intravenously, α to β blockade ratio is 1:7. Thus, labetalol can be thought to be a beta blocker with some α-blocking effects. By comparison, labetalol is a weaker β-adrenergic receptor blocker than propranolol, and has a weaker affinity for α-adrenergic receptors compared to phentolamine.

Labetalol's dual α- and β-adrenergic antagonism has different physiological effects in short- and long-term situations. In short-term, acute situations, labetalol decreases blood pressure by decreasing systemic vascular resistance with little effect on stroke volume, heart rate and cardiac output. During long-term use, labetalol can reduce heart rate during exercise while maintaining cardiac output by an increase in stroke volume.

Labetalol possesses significant intrinsic sympathomimetic activity (ISA). In particular, it is a partial agonist at β_{2}-adrenergic receptors located in the vascular smooth muscle. Labetalol relaxes vascular smooth muscle by a combination of this partial β_{2}-adrenergic receptor agonism and through α_{1}-adrenergic receptor blockade. Overall, this vasodilatory effect can decrease blood pressure. It was originally reported to lack ISA, but a slight degree of activity was subsequently characterized.

Similar to local anesthetics and sodium channel blocking antiarrhythmics, labetalol also has membrane stabilizing activity. By decreasing sodium entry, labetalol decreases action potential firing and thus has local anesthetic activity.

==== Physiological action ====
The physiological effects of labetalol when administered acutely (intravenously) are not predictable solely by their receptor blocking effect, i.e. blocking β_{1}-adrenergic receptors should decrease heart rate, but labetalol does not. When labetalol is given in acute situations, it decreases the peripheral vascular resistance and systemic blood pressure while having little effect on the heart rate, cardiac output and stroke volume, despite its α_{1}-, β_{1}- and β_{2}-adrenergic receptor blocking mechanism. These effects are mainly seen when the person is in the upright position.

Long term labetalol use also has different effects from other beta blockers. Other beta blockers, such as propranolol, persistently reduce cardiac output during exercise. The peripheral vascular resistance decreases when labetalol is first administered. Continuous labetalol use further decreases peripheral vascular resistance. However, during exercise, cardiac output remains the same due to a compensatory mechanism that increases stroke volume. Thus, labetalol is able to reduce heart rate during exercise while maintaining cardiac output by the increase in stroke volume.

=== Pharmacokinetics ===
==== Distribution ====
Labetalol is often classified as a beta blocker with low lipophilicity and hence lower potential for crossing the blood–brain barrier and blood–placenta barrier. This in turn may result in fewer effects in the central nervous system as well as a lower risk of neuropsychiatric side effects. Paradoxically however, labetalol actually shows high lipophilicity. In any case, labetalol, in animals including rats, rabbits, and dogs, was found to cross into the brain in negligible amounts, probably for reasons other than low lipophilicity. On the other hand, the drug has been shown to cross the blood–placenta barrier in humans.

== Chemistry ==
The minimum requirement for adrenergic agents is a primary or secondary amine separated from a substituted benzene ring by one or two carbons. This configuration results in strong agonist activity. As the size of the substituent attached to the amine becomes greater, particularly with respect to a t-butyl group, then the molecule typically is found to have receptor affinity without intrinsic activity, and is, therefore, an antagonist. Labetalol, with its 1-methyl-3-phenylpropyl substituted amine, is greater in size relative to a t-butyl group and therefore acts predominantly as an antagonist. The overall structure of labetalol is very polar. This was created by substituting the isopropyl group in the standard beta blocker structure with an aralkyl group, including a carboxamide group on the meta position, and by adding a hydroxyl group on the para position.

Labetalol has two chiral carbons and consequently exists as four stereoisomers. Two of these isomers, the (S,S)- and (R,S)- forms are inactive. The third, the (S,R)-isomer, is a powerful α_{1}-adrenergic receptor blocker. The fourth isomer, the (R,R)-isomer which is also known as dilevalol, is a mixed non-selective β-adrenergic receptor blocker and selective α_{1} blocker. Labetalol is typically given as a racemic mixture to achieve both α- and β-adrenergic receptor blocking activity.

Stereoisomers of labetalol
(R,R)-Labetalol; CAS number: 75659-07-3	(S,S)-Labetalol; CAS number: 83167-24-2
(R,S)-Labetalol; CAS number: 83167-32-2	(S,R)-Labetalol; CAS number: 83167-31-1

It is chemically designated in International Union of Pure and Applied Chemistry (IUPAC) nomenclature as 2-hydroxy-5-[1-hydroxy-2-[(1-methyl-3-phenylpropyl)amino]ethyl]benzamide monohydrochloride.

The experimental log P of labetalol is 2.7 to 3.1 and its predicted log P ranges from 1.73 to 3.1. Hence, it has relatively high lipophilicity.

== History ==
Labetalol was the first drug created that combined both α- and β-adrenergic receptor blocking properties. It was created to potentially fix the compensatory reflex issue that occurred when blocking a single receptor subtype, i.e. vasoconstriction after blocking β-adrenergic receptors or tachycardia after blocking α-adrenergic receptors. Because the reflex from blocking the single receptor subtypes acted to prevent the lowering of blood pressure, it was postulated that weak blocking of both α- and β-adrenergic receptors could work together to decrease blood pressure.
