= C3H9NO =

The molecular formula C_{3}H_{9}NO (molar mass: 75.11 g/mol, exact mass: 75.0684 u) may refer to:

- Propanolamine
  - Alaninol
  - 1-Amino-2-propanol
  - 3-Amino-1-propanol
- N-Methylethanolamine
- Trimethylamine N-oxide
