= TIPA =

TIPA may refer to:

- Gail Tipa, New Zealand resource management planner
- TIPA (Korea Technology & Information Promotion Agency for SMEs), to increase the competitiveness of SMEs by helping them achieve technological innovation and efficient management and informatization.
- TIPA (software), for typesetting IPA in TeX
- Tibetan Institute of Performing Arts, to preserve Tibetan artistic heritage
- Technical Image Press Association, an international association
- Tudor IT Process Assessment, a methodological framework for process assessment
- Triisopropanolamine, a chemical
- Tipa, a common name for the plant Tipuana tipu
- Tipa, samoan translation of the word juggernaut
- Tipa, an alternate name for Tuipang, Mizoram, India
- Triple India pale ale, a style of beer
- .tipa, a renamed .ipa file used with TrollStore

== See also ==
- Tipper (disambiguation)
