= Propanolamine =

Multiple organic compounds with the parent structure C3H9NO

In organic chemistry, propanolamine can describe any of the following parent compounds:

- 2-Amino-1-propanol, the hydrogenated derivative of alanine.
- 3-Amino-1-propanol, straight-chain and not widely used.
- 3-Amino-2-propanol (1-Aminopropan-2-ol) (isopropanolamines), prepared by addition of amines to one or two equivalents of propylene oxide.

The propanolamines include many derivatives where the amine is secondary or tertiary.

The parent propanolamines are colorless liquids with the formula C_{3}H_{9}NO.
