= Mulch =

Soil surface coverings

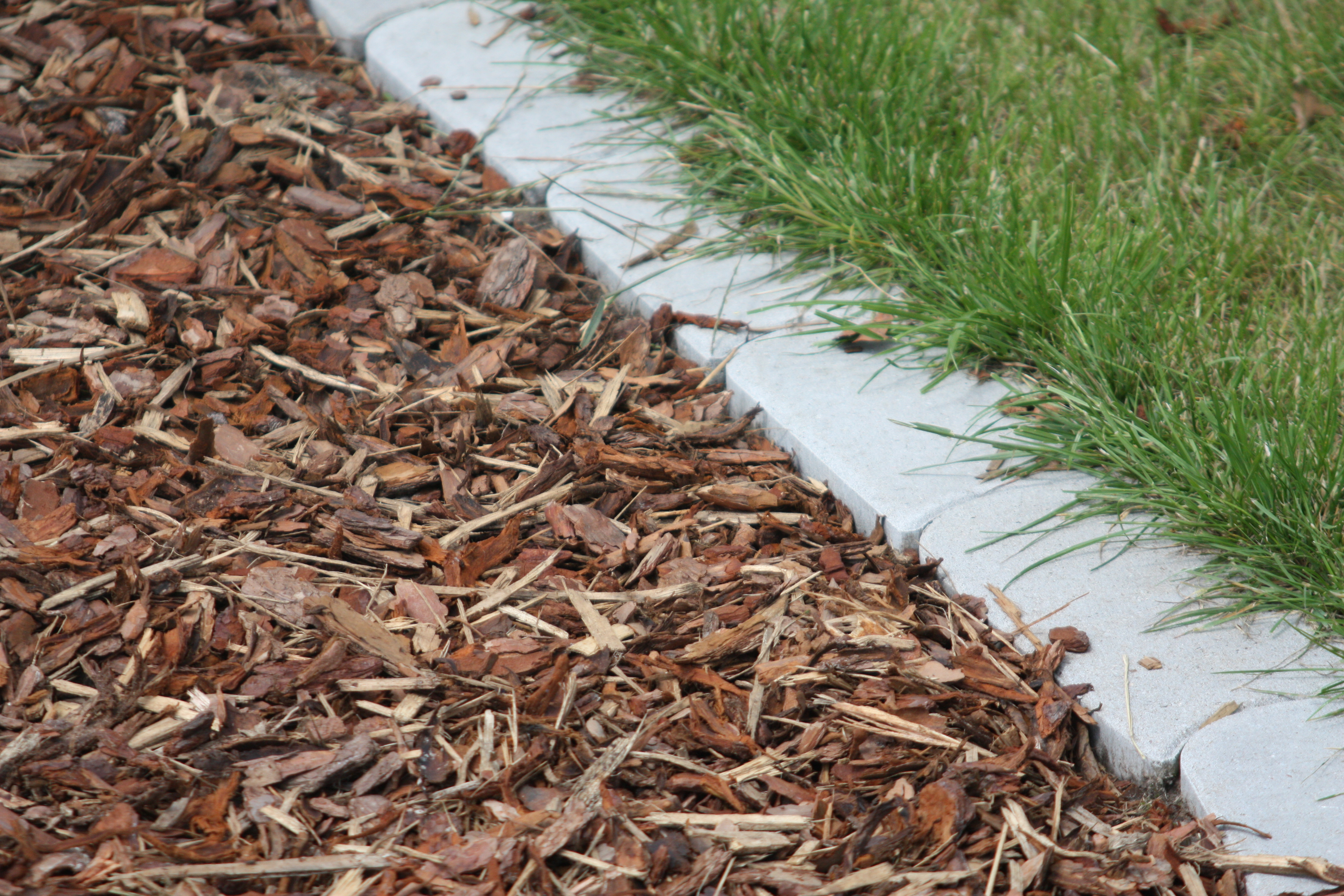
Bark chips applied as mulch

A mulch is a layer of material applied to the surface of soil. Reasons for applying mulch include conservation of soil moisture, improving fertility and health of the soil, reducing weed growth, and enhancing the visual appeal of the area.

Mulch is usually, but not exclusively, organic in nature. It may be permanent (e.g. plastic sheeting) or temporary (e.g. bark chips). It may be applied to bare soil or around existing plants. Mulches of manure and compost will be incorporated naturally into the soil by the activity of worms and other organisms. The process is used both in commercial crop production and in gardening, and when applied correctly, can improve soil productivity.

Living mulches include moss lawns and other ground covers.

== Uses ==
Many materials are used as mulches, which are used to retain soil moisture, regulate soil temperature, suppress weed growth, and for aesthetics. They are applied to the soil surface, around trees, paths, flower beds, to prevent soil erosion on slopes, and in production areas for flower and vegetable crops. Mulch layers are normally 5 centimetres (2 in) or more deep when applied.

Although mulch can be applied around established plants at any time, they may be applied at various times of the year depending on the purpose. Towards the beginning of the growing season, mulches serve initially to warm the soil by helping it retain heat which is otherwise lost during the night. This allows early seeding and transplanting of certain crops, and encourages faster growth. Mulch acts as an insulator. As the season progresses, mulch stabilizes the soil temperature and moisture, and prevents the growing of weeds from seeds.

In temperate climates, the effects of mulches depend upon the time of year in which they are applied. When applied in fall and winter, mulches delay the growth of perennial plants in the spring and prevent growth in winter during warm spells, thus limiting freeze–thaw damage.

The effect of mulch upon soil moisture content is complex. Mulch forms a layer between the soil and the atmosphere reducing evaporation. However, mulch can also prevent water from reaching the soil by absorbing or blocking water from light rains and overly thick layers of mulch can reduce oxygen in the soil.

In order to maximise the benefits of mulch, while minimizing its negative influences, it is often applied in late spring/early summer when soil temperatures have risen sufficiently, but soil moisture content is still relatively high. However, permanent mulch is also widely used and valued for its simplicity, as popularized by author Ruth Stout, who said, "My way is simply to keep a thick mulch of any vegetable matter that rots on both sides of my vegetable and flower garden all year long. As it decays and enriches the soils, I add more."

== Materials ==
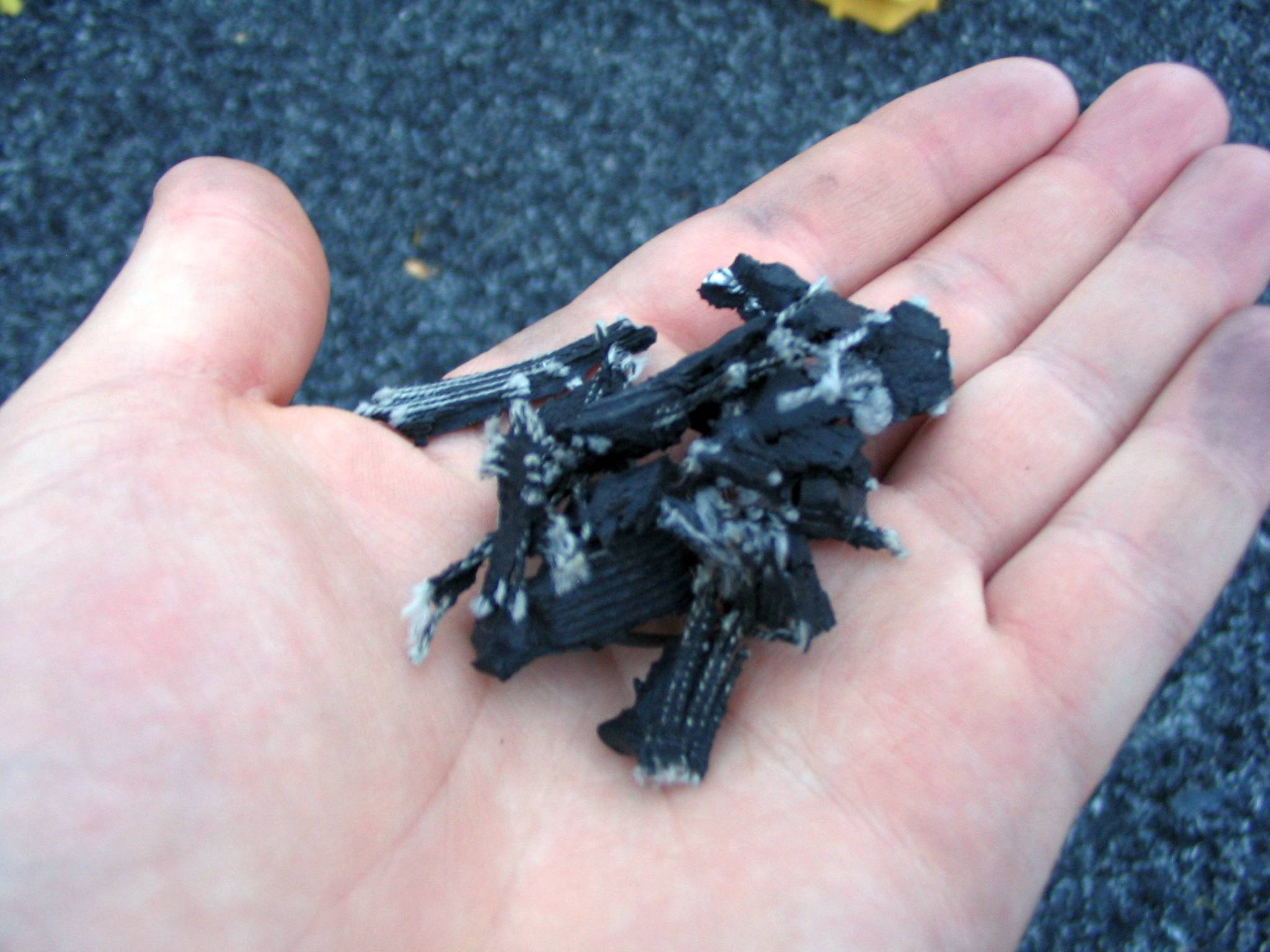
Rubber mulch nuggets in a playground. The white fibers are nylon cords, which are present in the tires from which the mulch is made.

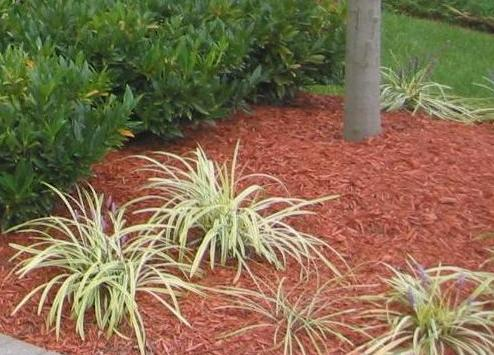
Shredded wood used as mulch. This type of mulch is frequently dyed for aesthetic reasons.

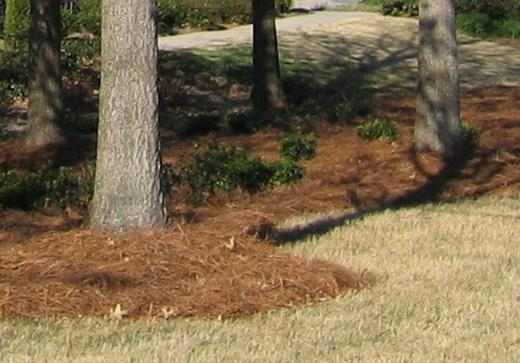
Pine needles used as mulch. Also called "pinestraw" in the southern US.

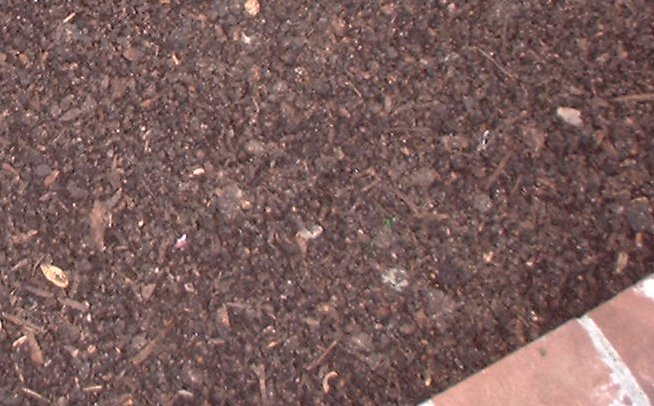
Aged compost mulch on a flower bed

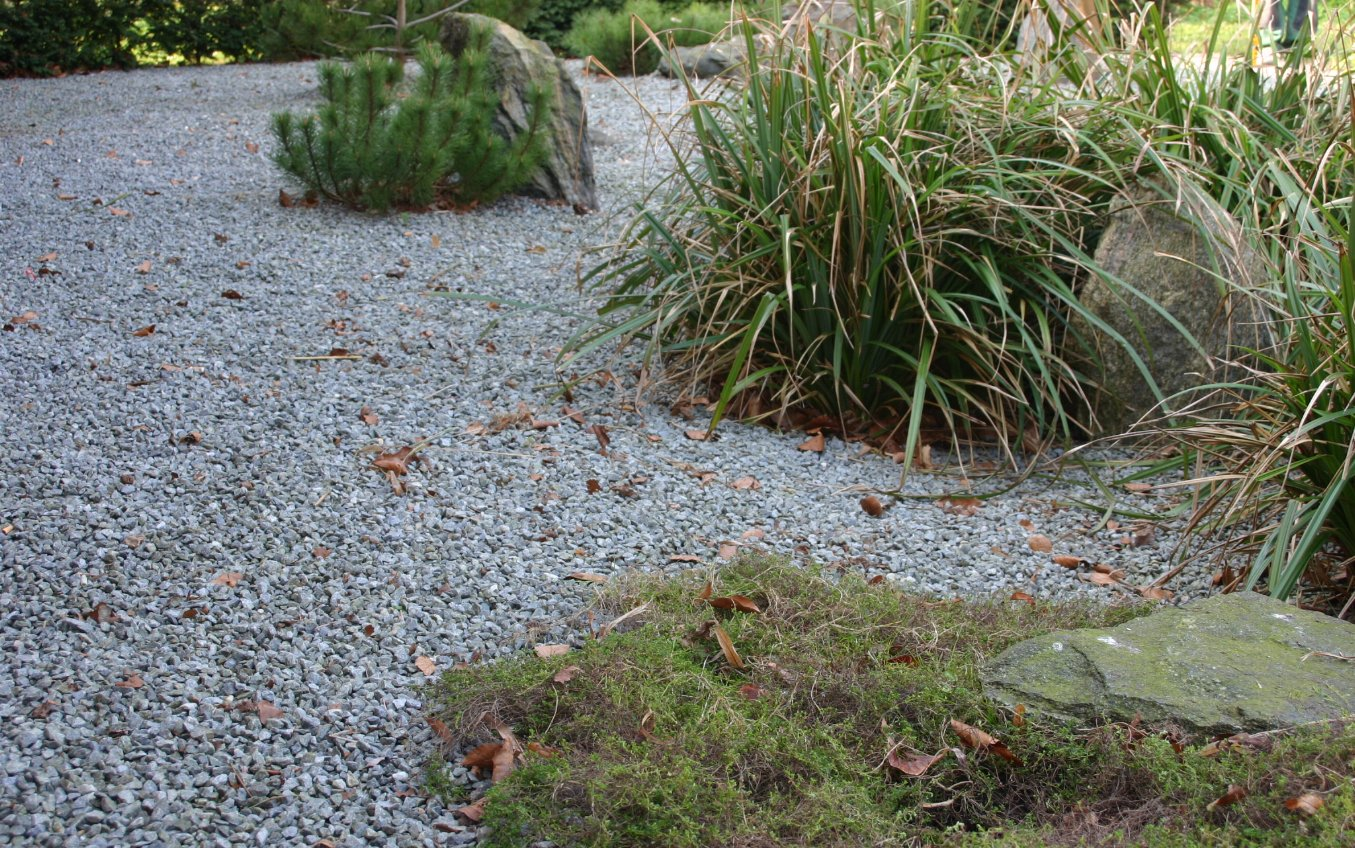
Crushed stone mulch

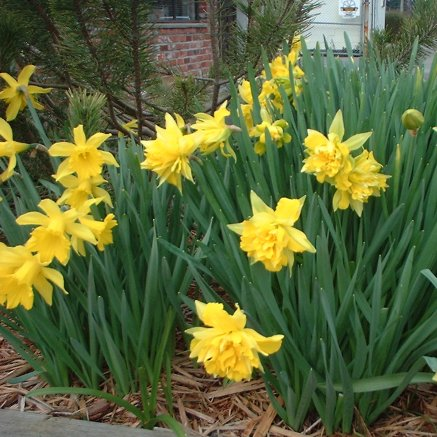
Spring daffodils push through shredded wood mulch

Materials used as mulches vary and depend on a number of factors. Use takes into consideration availability, cost, appearance, the effect it has on the soil—including chemical reactions and pH, durability, combustibility, rate of decomposition, how clean it is—some can contain weed seeds or plant pathogens.

A variety of materials are used as mulch:

- Organic residues: grass clippings, leaves, hay, straw, kitchen scraps, comfrey, shredded bark, whole bark nuggets, sawdust, shells, woodchips, shredded newspaper, cardboard, wool, animal manure, etc. Many of these materials also act as a direct composting system, such as the mulched clippings of a mulching lawn mower, or other organics applied as sheet composting.
- Compost: fully composted materials (humus) are used to avoid possible phytotoxicity problems. Materials that are free of seeds are ideally used, to prevent weeds being introduced by the mulch.
- Rubber mulch: made from recycled tire rubber.
- Plastic mulch: crops grow through slits or holes in thin plastic sheeting. This method is predominant in large-scale vegetable growing, with millions of acres cultivated under plastic mulch worldwide each year. Disposal of plastic mulch is cited as an environmental problem but there are also degradable plastic mulches.
- Rock and gravel can also be used as a mulch. In cooler climates the heat retained by rocks may extend the growing season.

In some areas of the United States, such as central Pennsylvania and northern California, mulch is often referred to as "tanbark", even by manufacturers and distributors. In these areas, the word "mulch" is used specifically to refer to very fine tanbark or peat moss.

=== Organic mulches ===
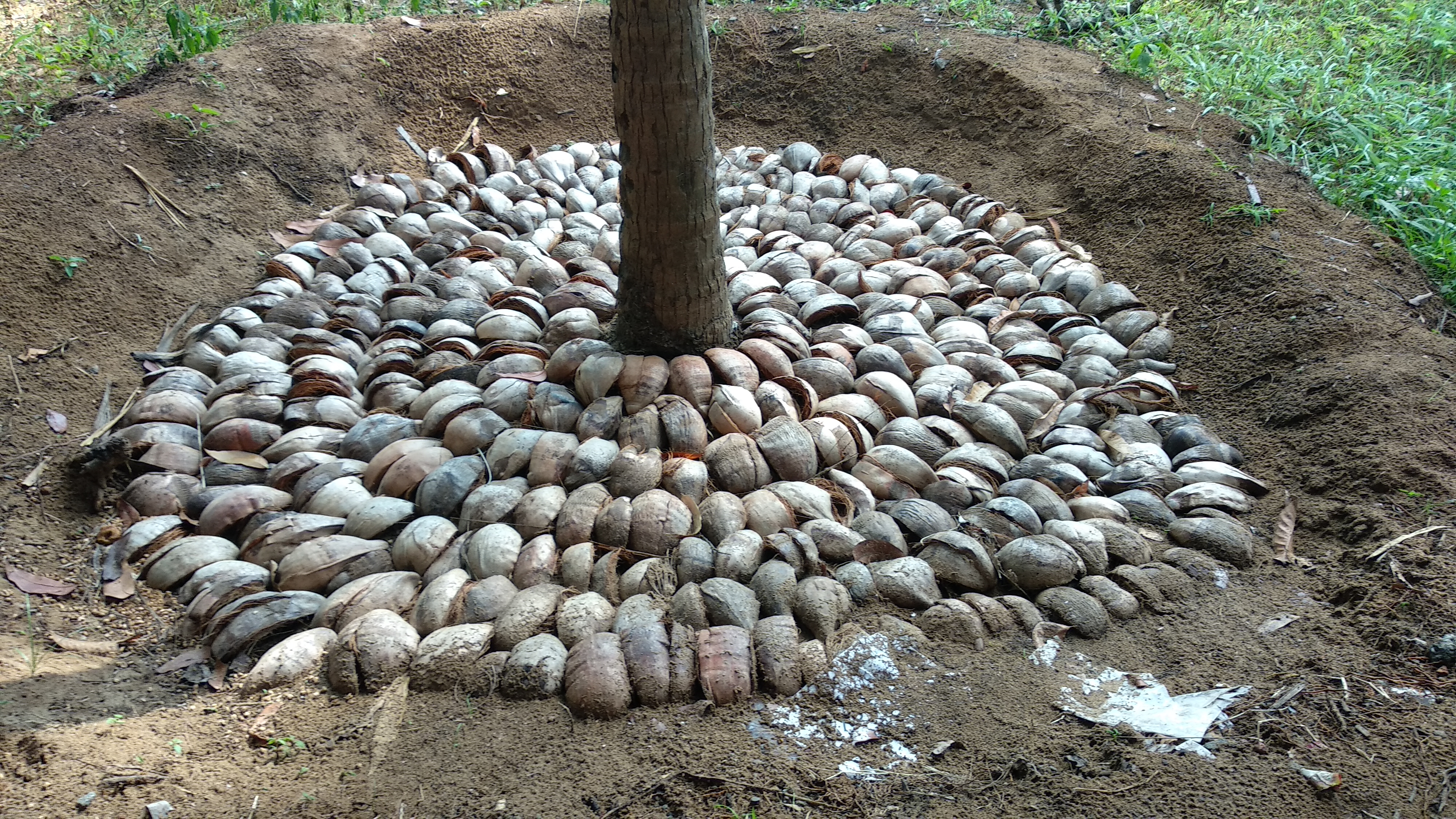
Coconut mulch

Organic mulches decay over time and are temporary. The way a particular organic mulch decomposes and reacts to wetting by rain and dew affects its usefulness. Some mulches such as straw, peat, sawdust and other wood products may for a while negatively affect plant growth because of their wide carbon to nitrogen ratio, because bacteria and fungi that decompose the materials remove nitrogen from the surrounding soil for growth. Organic mulches can mat down, forming a barrier that blocks water and air flow between the soil and the atmosphere. Vertically applied organic mulches can wick water from the soil to the surface, which can dry out the soil. Mulch made with wood can contain or feed termites, so care must be taken about not placing mulch too close to houses or building that can be damaged by those insects. Mulches placed too close to plant stems and tree trunks can contribute to their failure. Some mulch manufacturers recommend putting mulch several inches away from buildings.

Commonly available organic mulches include:

==== Leaves ====
Leaves from deciduous trees, which drop their foliage in the autumn/fall. They tend to be dry and blow around in the wind, so are often chopped or shredded before application. As they decompose they adhere to each other but also allow water and moisture to seep down to the soil surface. Thick layers of entire leaves, especially of maples and oaks, can form a soggy mat in winter and spring which can impede the new growth of lawn grass and other plants. Dry leaves are used as winter mulches to protect plants from freezing and thawing in areas with cold winters; they are normally removed during spring.

==== Grass clippings ====
Grass clippings, from mowed lawns are sometimes collected and used elsewhere as mulch. Grass clippings are dense and tend to mat down, so are mixed with tree leaves or rough compost to provide aeration and to facilitate their decomposition without smelly putrefaction. Rotting fresh grass clippings can damage plants; their rotting often produces a damaging buildup of trapped heat. Grass clippings are often dried thoroughly before application, which militates against rapid decomposition and excessive heat generation. Fresh green grass clippings are relatively high in nitrate content, and when used as a mulch, much of the nitrate is returned to the soil, conversely the routine removal of grass clippings from the lawn results in nitrogen deficiency for the lawn.

==== Peat moss ====
Peat moss, or sphagnum peat, is long lasting and packaged, making it convenient and popular as a mulch. When wetted and dried, it can form a dense crust that does not allow water to soak in. When dry it can also burn, producing a smoldering fire. It is sometimes mixed with pine needles to produce a mulch that is friable. It can also lower the pH of the soil surface, making it useful as a mulch under acid loving plants.

However, peat bogs are a valuable wildlife habitat, and peat is also one of the largest stores of carbon (in Britain, out of a total estimated 9952 million tonnes of carbon in British vegetation and soils, 6948 million tonnes carbon are estimated to be in Scottish, mostly peatland, soils).

==== Wood chips ====
Wood chips are a byproduct of the pruning of trees by arborists, utilities and parks; they are used to dispose of bulky waste. Tree branches and large stems are rather coarse after chipping and tend to be used as a mulch at least three inches thick. The chips are used to conserve soil moisture, moderate soil temperature and suppress weed growth. Wood chip mulches on the top of the soil increase nutrient levels in soils and associated plant foliage, contrary to the myth that wood chip mulch tie up nitrogen. Wood chips are most often used under trees and shrubs. When used around soft stemmed plants, an unmulched zone is left around the plant stems to prevent stem rot or other possible diseases. They are often used to mulch trails, because they are readily produced with little additional cost outside of the normal disposal cost of tree maintenance. Wood chips come in various colors.

Woodchip mulch is a byproduct of reprocessing used (untreated) timber (usually packaging pallets), to dispose of wood waste. The chips are used to conserve soil moisture, moderate soil temperature and suppress weed growth. Woodchip mulch is often used under trees, shrubs or large planting areas and can last much longer than arborist mulch. In addition, many consider woodchip mulch to be visually appealing, as it comes in various colors. Woodchips can also be reprocessed into playground woodchip to be used as an impact-attenuating playground surfacing.

==== Bark chips ====
Bark chips of various grades are produced from the outer corky bark layer of timber trees. Sizes vary from thin shredded strands to large coarse blocks. The finer types are very attractive but have a large exposed surface area that leads to quicker decay. Layers two or three inches deep are usually used, bark is relativity inert and its decay does not demand soil nitrates. Bark chips are also available in various colors.

==== Straw mulch / field hay / salt hay ====
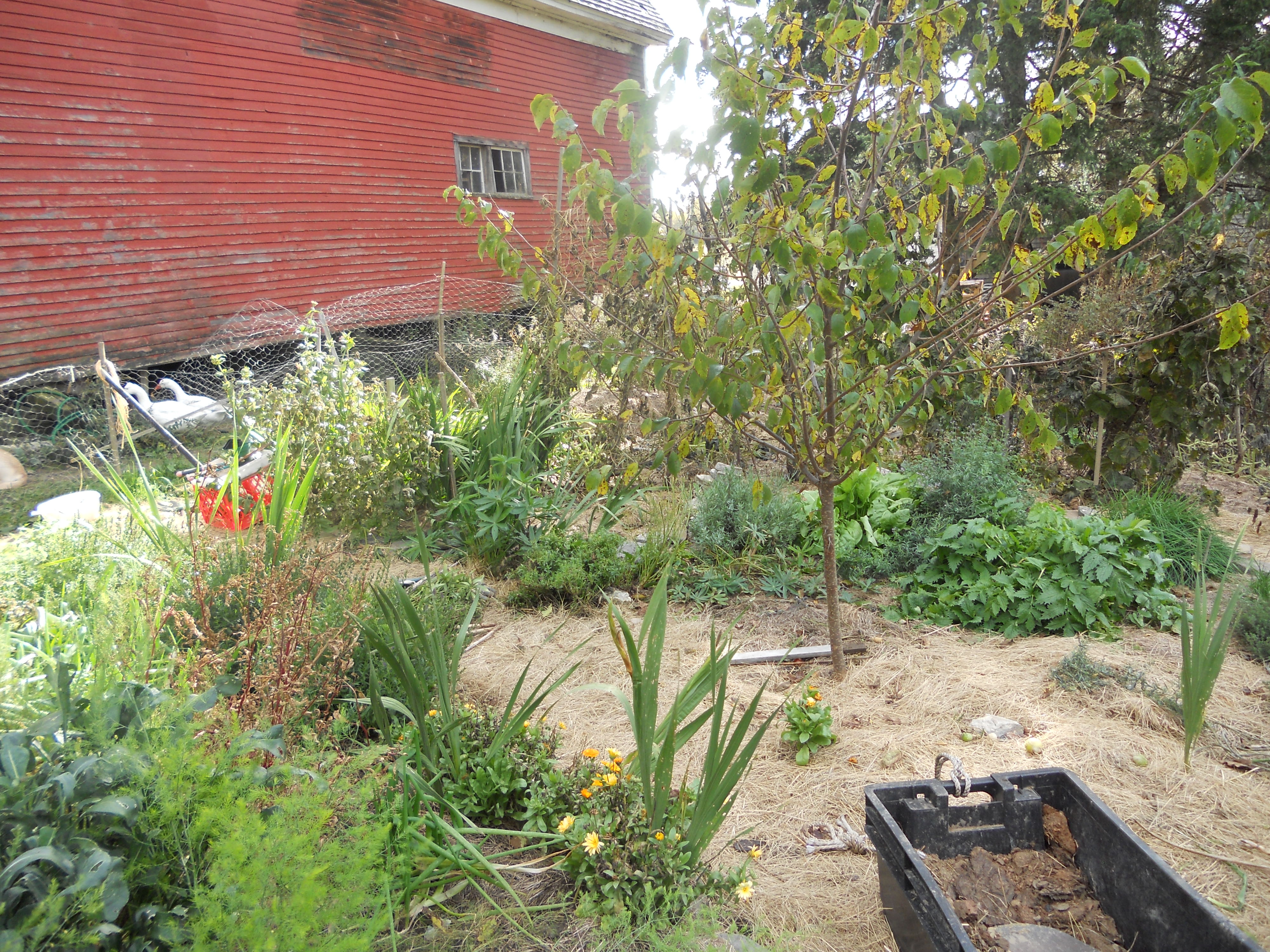
Permaculture garden with a fruit tree, herbs, flowers and vegetables mulched with hay

Straw mulch or field hay or salt hay are lightweight and normally sold in compressed bales. They have an unkempt look and are used in vegetable gardens and as a winter covering. They are biodegradable and neutral in pH. They have good moisture retention and weed controlling properties but also are more likely to be contaminated with weed seeds. Salt hay is less likely to have weed seeds than field hay. Straw mulch is also available in various colors.

==== Pine straw ====
Needles that drop from pine trees are termed pine straw. It is available in bales. Pine straw has an attractive look and is used in landscape and garden settings. On application pine needles tend to weave together, a characteristic that helps the mulch hold stormwater on steeper slopes. This interlocking tendency combined with a resistance to floating gives it further advantages in maintaining cover and preventing soil erosion. The interlocking tendency also helps keep the mulch structure from collapsing and forming a barrier to infiltration. Pine straw is reputed to create ideal conditions for acid-loving plants. Pine straw may help to acidify soils but studies indicate this effect is often too small to be measurable.

==== Biodegradable mulch ====
Biodegradable mulches are made out of plant starches and sugars or polyester fibers. These starches can come from plants such as wheat and maize. These mulch films may be a bit more permeable allowing more water into the soil. This mulch can prevent soil erosion, reduce weeding, conserve soil moisture, and increase temperature of the soil. Ultimately this can reduce the amount of herbicides used and manual labor farmers may have to do throughout the growing season. At the end of the season these mulches will start to break down from heat. Microorganisms in the soil break down the mulch into two components, water and carbon dioxide, leaving no toxic residues behind. This source of mulch requires less manual labor since it does not need to be removed at the end of the season and can actually be tilled into the soil. With this mulch it is important to take into consideration that it is much more delicate than other kinds. It should be placed on a day which is not too hot and with less tension than other synthetic mulches. These also can be placed by machine or hand but it is ideal to have a more starchy mulch that will allow it to stick to the soil better.

==== Cardboard / newspaper ====
Cardboard or newspaper can be used as semi-organic mulches. These are best used as a base layer upon which a heavier mulch such as compost is placed to prevent the lighter cardboard/newspaper layer from blowing away. By incorporating a layer of cardboard/newspaper into a mulch, the quantity of heavier mulch can be reduced, whilst improving the weed suppressant and moisture retaining properties of the mulch. However, additional labour is expended when planting through a mulch containing a cardboard/newspaper layer, as holes must be cut for each plant. Sowing seed through mulches containing a cardboard/newspaper layer is impractical. Application of newspaper mulch in windy weather can be facilitated by briefly pre-soaking the newspaper in water to increase its weight.

=== Synthetic ===
==== Plastics ====
Plastic mulch used in large-scale commercial production is laid down with a tractor-drawn or standalone layer of plastic mulch. This is usually part of a sophisticated mechanical process, where raised beds are formed, plastic is rolled out on top, and seedlings are transplanted through it. Drip irrigation is often required, with drip tape laid under the plastic, as plastic mulch is impermeable to water.

==== Polypropylene and polyethylene mulch ====
Polypropylene mulch is made up of polypropylene polymers where polyethylene mulch is made up of polyethylene polymers. These mulches are commonly used in many plastics. Polyethylene is used mainly for weed reduction, whereas polypropylene is used mainly on perennials. This mulch is placed on top of the soil and can be done by machine or hand with pegs to keep the mulch tight against the soil. This mulch can prevent soil erosion, reduce weeding, conserve soil moisture, and increase temperature of the soil. Ultimately this can reduce the amount of work a farmer may have to do, and the amount of herbicides applied during the growing period. The black and clear mulches capture sunlight and warm the soil increasing the growth rate. White and other reflective colours will also warm the soil, but they do not suppress weeds as well. This mulch may require other sources of obtaining water such as drip irrigation since it can reduce the amount of water that reaches the soil. This mulch needs to be manually removed at the end of the season since when it starts to break down it breaks down into smaller pieces. If the mulch is not removed before it starts to break down eventually it will break down into ketones and aldehydes polluting the soil. This mulch is technically biodegradable but does not break down into the same materials the more natural biodegradable mulch does.

==== Colored mulch ====
Some organic mulches are colored red, brown, black, and other colors using synthetic additives. Isopropanolamine, specifically 1-Amino-2-propanol or monoisopropanolamine, may be used as a pigment dispersant and color fastener in these mulches. Types of mulch which can be dyed include: wood chips, bark chips (barkdust) and pine straw. Colored mulch is made by dyeing the mulch in a water-based solution of colorant and chemical binder.

When colored mulch first entered the market, most formulas were suspected to contain toxic substances, heavy metals and other contaminates. Today, "current investigations indicate that mulch colorants pose no threat to people, pets or the environment. The dyes currently used by the mulch and soil industry are similar to those used in the cosmetic and other manufacturing industries (i.e., iron oxide)", as stated by the Mulch and Soil Council. According to colorant manufacturer Colorbiotics, independent laboratory studies show that the colorants used in colored mulch are safer than table salt or baking soda.

Colored mulch can be applied anywhere non-colored mulch is used (such as large bedded areas or around plants) and features many of the same gardening benefits as traditional mulch, such as improving soil productivity and retaining moisture. As mulch decomposes, just as with non-colored mulch, more mulch may need to be added to continue providing benefits to the soil and plants. However, if mulch is faded, spraying dye to previously spread mulch in order to restore color is an option.

== Anaerobic (sour) mulch ==
Organic mulches often smell like freshly cut wood but sometimes they start to smell like vinegar, ammonia, sulfur or silage. This happens when material with ample nitrogen content is not rotated often enough and it forms pockets of increased decomposition. When this occurs, the process may become anaerobic and produce phytotoxic materials in small quantities. Once exposed to the air, the process quickly reverts to an aerobic process, but the anaerobic metabolites may be present for a period of time. Plants low to the ground or freshly planted are the most susceptible, and phytotoxicity from the produced chemicals may prevent germination of some seeds.

== Groundcovers (living mulches) ==
Groundcovers are plants which grow close to the ground, under the main crop, to slow the development of weeds and provide other benefits of mulch. They are usually fast-growing plants that continue growing with the main crops. By contrast, cover crops are incorporated into the soil or killed with herbicides. However, live mulches also may need to be mechanically or chemically killed eventually to prevent competition with the main crop.

Some groundcovers can perform additional roles in the garden such as nitrogen fixation in the case of clovers, dynamic accumulation of nutrients from the subsoil in the case of creeping comfrey (Symphytum ibericum), and even food production in the case of Rubus tricolor.

== On-site production ==
Owing to the great bulk of mulch which is often required on a site, it is often impractical and expensive to source and import sufficient mulch materials. An alternative to importing mulch materials is to grow them on site in a "mulch garden" – an area of the site dedicated entirely to the production of mulch which is then transferred to the growing area. Mulch gardens should be sited as close as possible to the growing area so as to facilitate transfer of mulch materials.

== See also ==
- Forestry mulching
- Rubber mulch
- Sheet mulching
- Plant litter
- Plasticulture
- Good agricultural practice
- Integrated pest management
- Living mulch
- Mulching machine
