= Azetidine =

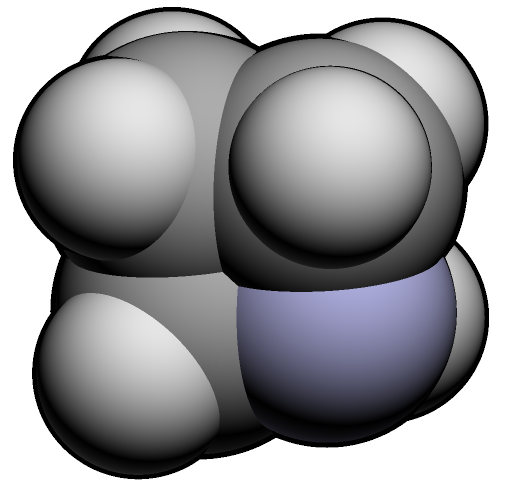

Names
- Preferred IUPAC name Azetidine
- Systematic IUPAC name Azacyclobutane
- Other names Azetane; Trimethylene imine 1,3-Propylenimine

Identifiers
CAS Number	503-29-7
3D model (JSmol)	Interactive image
Beilstein Reference	102384
ChEBI	CHEBI:30968
ChEMBL	ChEMBL2171713
ChemSpider	9993
ECHA InfoCard	100.007.240
EC Number	207-963-8
Gmelin Reference	986
PubChem CID	10422
UNII	37S883XDWR
CompTox Dashboard (EPA)	DTXSID8060117
- InChI: InChI=1S/C3H7N/c1-2-4-3-1/h4H,1-3H2 Key: HONIICLYMWZJFZ-UHFFFAOYSA-N; InChI=1/C3H7N/c1-2-4-3-1/h4H,1-3H2 Key: HONIICLYMWZJFZ-UHFFFAOYAE
- SMILES: N1CCC1

Properties
Chemical formula	C_{3}H_{7}N
Molar mass	57.09 g/mol
Appearance	colorless liquid
Density	0.847 g/cm^{3} at 25 °C
Boiling point	61 to 62 °C (142 to 144 °F; 334 to 335 K)
Solubility in water	miscible
Acidity (pK_{a})	11.29 (conjugate acid; H_{2}O)

Hazards
- Occupational safety and health (OHS/OSH)
Main hazards	Somewhat strong base, combustible
- GHS labelling
Pictograms	(GHS02: Flammable) (GHS05: Corrosive)
Signal word	Danger
Hazard statements	H225, H314
Precautionary statements	P210, P233, P240, P241, P242, P243, P260, P264, P280, P301+P330+P331, P303+P361+P353, P304+P340, P305+P351+P338, P310, P321, P363, P370+P378, P403+P235, P405, P501

Related compounds
Other anions	Oxetane, Phosphetane, Thietane
Related compounds	Aziridine, Diazetidine, Pyrrolidine, Piperidine, Azepane, Azocane, Azonane
- Except where otherwise noted, data are given for materials in their standard state (at 25 °C [77 °F], 100 kPa). verify (what is ?) Infobox references

Azetidine is a saturated heterocyclic organic compound containing three carbon atoms and one nitrogen atom. It is a liquid at room temperature with a strong odor of ammonia and is strongly basic compared to most secondary amines.

== Synthesis and occurrence ==
Mugineic acid, an iron-binding azetidine.

Azetidines can be prepared by reduction of azetidinones (β-lactams) with lithium aluminium hydride. Even more effective is a mixture of lithium aluminium hydride and aluminium trichloride, a source of "AlClH_{2}" and "AlCl_{2}H".

Azetidine can also be produced by a multistep route from 1,3-disubstituted alkanes. Thus, for example, a multistep route builds azetidine from 3-amino-1-propanol, acrylic acid, thionyl chloride, and base; likewise, azetidine dicarboxylic acids form when glutaric anhydride is brominated (at the α position) and then aminated.

Regio- and diastereoselective synthesis of 2-arylazetidines could be performed from appropriately substituted oxiranes via ring transformation. It is controlled by Baldwin's Rules with remarkable functional group tolerance.

The Paternò−Büchi reaction has an aza analogue.

Azetidine and its derivatives are relatively rare structural motifs in natural products. They are a component of mugineic acids and penaresidins. Perhaps the most abundant azetidine containing natural product is azetidine-2-carboxylic acid - a toxic mimic of proline.

== See also ==
- Azete, the unsaturated analog
