= Couty's azetidine synthesis =

Azetidine synthesis by François Couty

Couty's azetidine synthesis is one of the most efficient synthesis of azetidines named after French organic chemist François Couty from University of Versailles Saint-Quentin-en-Yvelines. It enables an easy synthesis of a broad range of enantiopure azetidines from readily available β-amino alcohols by their chlorination followed by deprotonation and a 4-exo-trig ring closure.

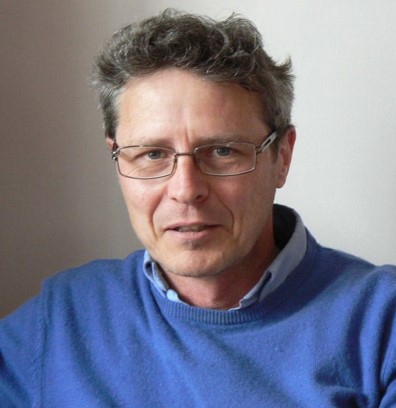
François Couty

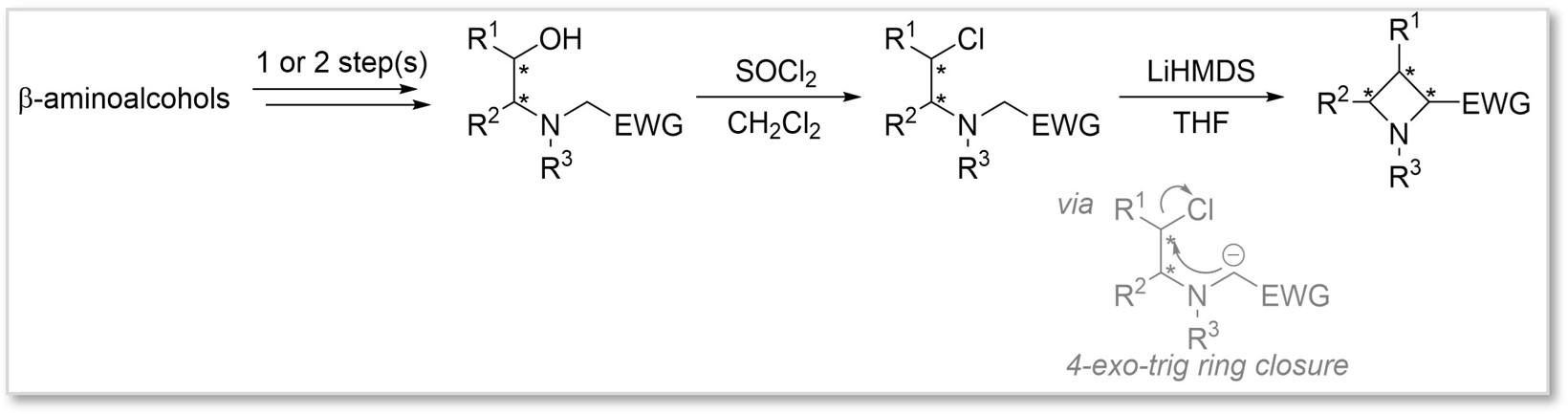
Couty's azetidine synthesis

It was originally reported from N-alkyl- or N-aryl- N-cyanomethylated β-aminoalcohols but other electron-withdrawing groups such as esters or phosphonates are also suitable and the chloride can be replaced by a Michael acceptor. Over the years, the Couty's azetidine synthesis was shown to be efficient to access a variety of enantiopure azetidines and 2-cyano-azetidines were shown to be excellent scaffolds and building blocks in heterocyclic chemistry and for molecular diversity. It was notably extensively utilized by the Broad Institute of MIT and Harvard for the synthesis and profiling of a collection of azetidine-based scaffolds for the development of CNS-focused lead-like libraries, and by Galapagos NV for the discovery and optimization of an azetidine library for the development of free fatty acid receptor 2 (FFA2) antagonists.
