= (R)-aminopropanol dehydrogenase =

Class of enzymes

Identifiers
- EC no.: 1.1.1.75
- CAS no.: 37250-13-8

Databases
- IntEnz: IntEnz view
- BRENDA: BRENDA entry
- ExPASy: NiceZyme view
- KEGG: KEGG entry
- MetaCyc: metabolic pathway
- PRIAM: profile
- PDB structures: RCSB PDB PDBe PDBsum
- Gene Ontology: AmiGO / QuickGO
Search
- PMC: articles
- PubMed: articles
- NCBI: proteins

In enzymology, a (R)-aminopropanol dehydrogenase (EC 1.1.1.75) is an enzyme that catalyzes the chemical reaction

(2R)-1-aminopropan-2-ol
+ NAD^{+}
H^{+}
H^{+}
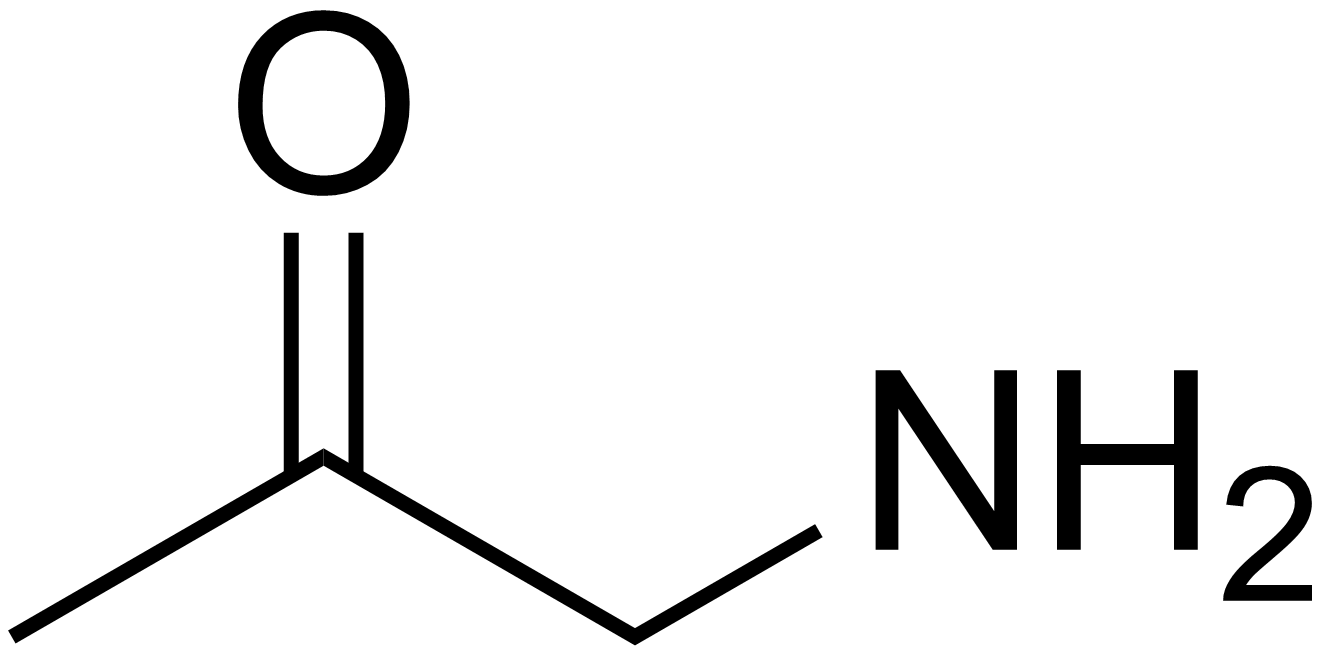
aminoacetone
+ NADH

The two substrates of this enzyme are (2R)-1-aminopropan-2-ol and oxidised nicotinamide adenine dinucleotide (NAD^{+}). Its products are aminoacetone, reduced NADH, and a proton.

This enzyme belongs to the family of oxidoreductases, specifically those acting on the CH-OH group of donor with NAD^{+} or NADP^{+} as acceptor. The systematic name of this enzyme class is (R)-1-aminopropan-2-ol:NAD^{+} oxidoreductase. Other names in common use include L-aminopropanol dehydrogenase, 1-aminopropan-2-ol-NAD^{+} dehydrogenase, L(^{+})-1-aminopropan-2-ol:NAD^{+} oxidoreductase, 1-aminopropan-2-ol-dehydrogenase, DL-1-aminopropan-2-ol: NAD^{+} dehydrogenase, and L(^{+})-1-aminopropan-2-ol-NAD^{+}/NADP^{+} oxidoreductase. This enzyme participates in glycine, serine and threonine metabolism. It requires potassium as a cofactor.
