= Serinol =

Identifiers
CAS Number	534-03-2
3D model (JSmol)	Interactive image
ChEMBL	ChEMBL116834
ChemSpider	61591
ECHA InfoCard	100.007.805
EC Number	208-584-0
PubChem CID	68294
UNII	IC94L30J8M
CompTox Dashboard (EPA)	DTXSID2060202
- InChI: InChI=1S/C3H9NO2/c4-3(1-5)2-6/h3,5-6H,1-2,4H2 Key: KJJPLEZQSCZCKE-UHFFFAOYSA-N
- SMILES: C(C(CO)N)O

Properties
Chemical formula	C_{3}H_{9}NO_{2}
Molar mass	91.110 g·mol^{−1}
Appearance	Colorless solid
Melting point	128 °C (262 °F; 401 K)
Boiling point	115–120 °C (239–248 °F; 388–393 K) at 0.06 Torr
- Except where otherwise noted, data are given for materials in their standard state (at 25 °C [77 °F], 100 kPa). Infobox references

Serinol is the organic compound with the formula H_{2}NCH(CH_{2}OH)_{2}. A colorless solid, it is classified both as an amino alcohol and as a diol. It is structurally related to glycerol. Its name reflects the compound's relationship to the amino acid serine, from which it can be produced by hydrogenation. Other amino alcohols derived from amino acids include alaninol, leucinol, and tyrosinol.

Biosynthetically, it is derived from dihydroxyacetone phosphate. It can be prepared in several steps starting with the condensation of nitromethane with two equivalents of formaldehyde.

An N,O-protected form of serinol can be produced from serine.
