= Azetidine-2-carboxylic acid =

Names
- IUPAC name Azetidine-2-carboxylic acid

Identifiers
CAS Number	2133-34-8
3D model (JSmol)	Interactive image
ChEBI	CHEBI:6198
ChEMBL	ChEMBL1165239
ChemSpider	15628
ECHA InfoCard	100.016.693
EC Number	218-362-5
IUPHAR/BPS	4686
KEGG	C08267
PubChem CID	16486 L-
UNII	5GZ3E0L9ZU
CompTox Dashboard (EPA)	DTXSID0044020
- InChI: InChI=1S/C4H7NO2/c6-4(7)3-1-2-5-3/h3,5H,1-2H2,(H,6,7)/t3-/m0/s1 Key: IADUEWIQBXOCDZ-VKHMYHEASA-N; InChI=1/C4H7NO2/c6-4(7)3-1-2-5-3/h3,5H,1-2H2,(H,6,7)/t3-/m0/s1 Key: IADUEWIQBXOCDZ-VKHMYHEABQ
- SMILES: O=C(O)[C@H]1NCC1

Properties
Chemical formula	C_{4}H_{7}NO_{2}
Molar mass	101.104 g/mol
Appearance	crystalline solid
Density	1.275 g/cm^{3}
Melting point	215 °C (419 °F; 488 K)
Boiling point	242 °C (468 °F; 515 K)
Solubility in water	5.0 g/100 ml

Hazards
Flash point	100.1 °C (212.2 °F; 373.2 K)
- Except where otherwise noted, data are given for materials in their standard state (at 25 °C [77 °F], 100 kPa). verify (what is ?) Infobox references

Azetidine-2-carboxylic acid (abbreviated Aze or Azc) is a plant non-protein amino acid homologue of proline with the molecular formula C_{4}H_{7}NO_{2}. Aze is a heterocyclic, 4 membered ring with nitrogen as its heteroatom (an azetidine), and a carboxylic acid group substituted on one of the ring carbon atoms. The main difference between Aze and proline is the ring of Aze has four members and the ring of proline has five. Aze has the ability to act as an analog of proline and can be incorporated into proteins in place of proline.

== Synthesis ==
Optically inactive Aze was obtained in small yield from the neurotransmitter GABA by α-bromination, followed by removal of hydrogen bromide from the intermediate γ-amino-α-bromobutyric acid and ring closure by treatment with a barium hydroxide solution. An optically active Aze was obtained by treatment of α,γ-diaminobutyric acid dihydrochloride with a mixture of nitrous and hydrochloric acids to yield γ-amino-α-chlorobutyric acid, followed by elimination of hydrogen chloride and cyclization by treatment with barium hydroxide.

== Occurrence ==
Azetidine-2-carboxylic acid has been known since 1955 to be present in rhizomes and fresh foliage of certain plants. It is known to occur in two species from the Asparagaceae - Convallaria majalis (lily of the valley), and Polygonatum (solomon's seal).

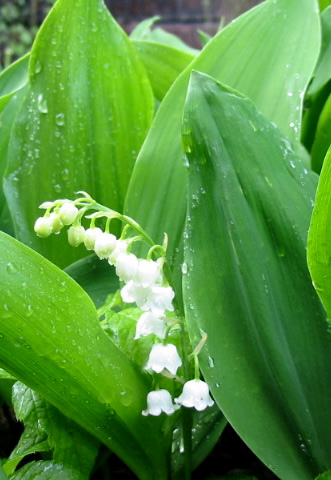
Lily of the Valley

Aze is also found in numerous plants from the bean family Fabaceae, and has also been detected in small quantities in table beets, garden beets, and sugar beets.

== Toxicity ==
It has been shown that when Aze is misincorporated into proteins in place of proline, Aze deters the growth of competing vegetation and poisons predators. Other studies have shown effects of Aze resulting in a wide range of toxic and teratogenic disorders, including in a range of malformations, in various animal species including ducks, hamsters, mice, and rabbits.

Misincorporation of Aze into human proteins can alter collagen, keratin, hemoglobin, and protein folding. However, the lack of detailed toxicologic data and the need for more direct evidence about the damaging effects of the misincorporation of Aze on specific proteins are reasons why the toxicity of Aze to humans cannot be determined at this time. Molecular studies of human prolyl- and alanyl-tRNA synthetases suggest that Aze is incorporated in proteins as proline with toxic consequences in vivo. Even if Aze seems to fit into the active site of both tRNA synthetases (due to its double mimicry effect of alanine and proline), it is rejected by alanyl-tRNA synthetases post-transfer editing system.
