= Triisopropanolamine =

Names
- Preferred IUPAC name 1,1′,1′′-Nitrilotri(propan-2-ol)
- Other names 1-[Bis(2-hydroxypropyl)amino]propan-2-ol; Tris(2-hydroxypropyl)amine; Tri-2-propanolamine; Tri-iso-propanolamine; Tris(2-propanol)amine

Identifiers
CAS Number	122-20-3
3D model (JSmol)	Interactive image
Abbreviations	TIPA
ChEBI	CHEBI:170017
ChEMBL	ChEMBL1877948
ChemSpider	23121
ECHA InfoCard	100.004.118
EC Number	204-528-4
PubChem CID	24730
UNII	W9EN9DLM98
UN number	3259
CompTox Dashboard (EPA)	DTXSID5021415
- InChI: InChI=1S/C9H21NO3/c1-7(11)4-10(5-8(2)12)6-9(3)13/h7-9,11-13H,4-6H2,1-3H3 Key: SLINHMUFWFWBMU-UHFFFAOYSA-N
- SMILES: CC(CN(CC(C)O)CC(C)O)O

Properties
Chemical formula	C_{9}H_{21}NO_{3}
Molar mass	191.271 g·mol^{−1}
Appearance	White to off-white solid
Melting point	48–52 °C (118–126 °F; 321–325 K)
Boiling point	305 °C (581 °F; 578 K)

Hazards
- GHS labelling
Pictograms	(GHS07: Exclamation mark)
Signal word	Warning
Hazard statements	H319
Precautionary statements	P264+P265, P280, P305+P351+P338, P337+P317
- Except where otherwise noted, data are given for materials in their standard state (at 25 °C [77 °F], 100 kPa). Infobox references

Triisopropanolamine is an amine used for a variety of industrial applications including as an emulsifier, stabilizer, and chemical intermediate. It is also used to neutralize acidic components of some herbicides.

== See also ==
- 1-Amino-2-propanol
- Diisopropanolamine
