= Barkdust =

Mulch made of shredded tree bark

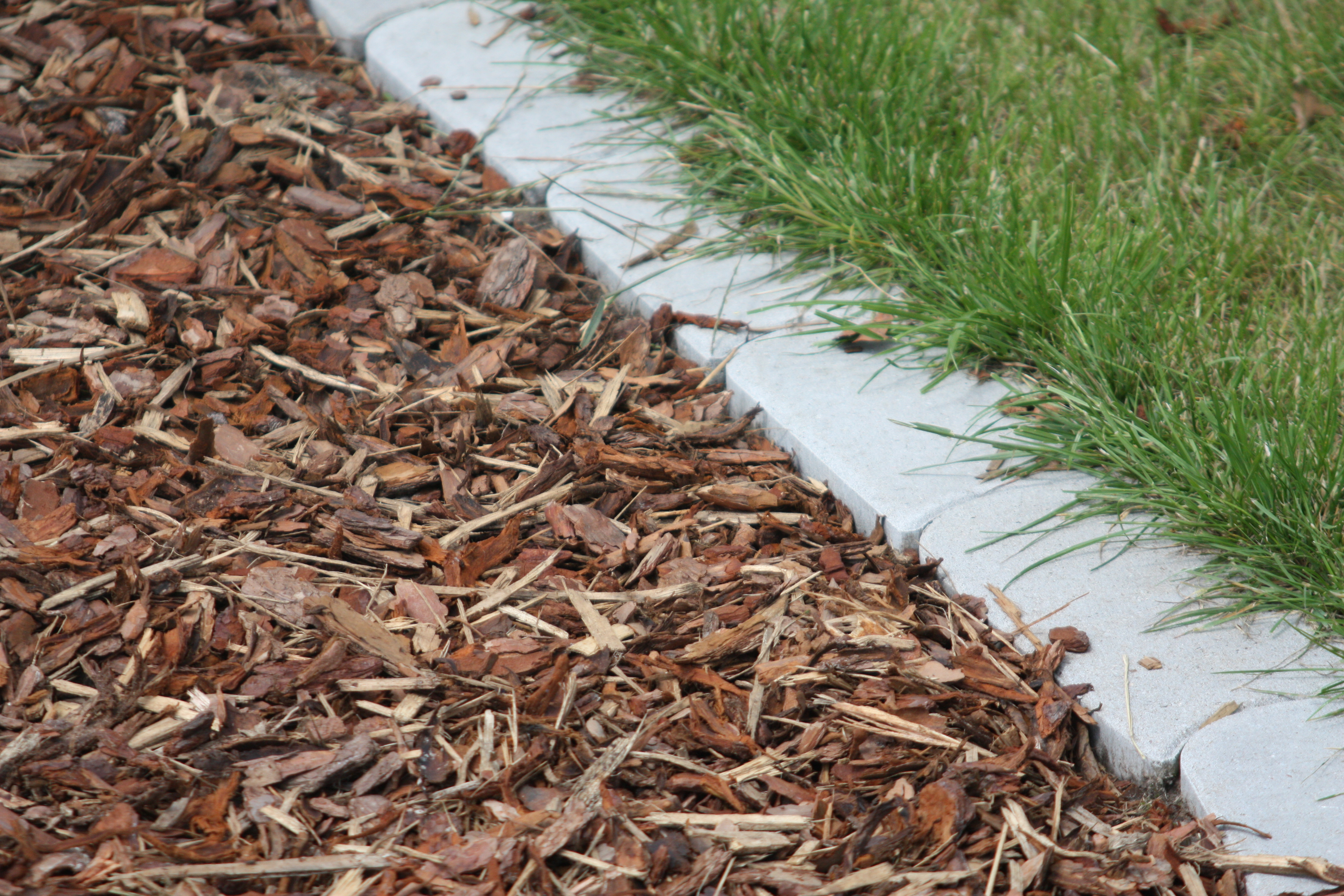
Barkdust being used as mulch.

In agriculture, gardening, and landscaping, barkdust (also bark dust, bark chips, bark mulch, beauty bark, tanbark, tan bark, or simply bark) is a form of mulch produced out of chipped or shredded tree bark. Coarser forms of barkdust may be known as bark nuggets. Trees typically used in the production of barkdust include the Douglas fir and the western hemlock.

== Production and types of barkdust ==
Barkdust is commonly produced from several tree species. The Douglas fir and the Western hemlock are the most common sources of barkdust, with cedar bark also being used. Barkdust may be a byproduct of lumber production, of yard debris recycling processes, or it may be produced in its own right. Barkdust is typically categorized by the source plant, as well as by the coarseness of the resulting material. Fine barkdusts are used as mulch, with coarser forms being used for weed control, as a playground surface, or for decorative purposes.

According to voluntary guidelines published by the Mulch and Soil Council, a trade group of mulch and soil producers, a material with "bark" in the name should consist of "the corky exterior covering of trees, with a maximum wood content (interior xylem of 15%)". Products with greater than 15% wood content may be labelled as "wood mulch", but should not be called "bark", according to the group's guidelines.

Fresh fir bark is reddish-brown in color. The bark from cedar or hemlock is more tan in color, as the processes which produce these types of barkdust may leave a greater percentage of wood (as opposed to bark) in the resulting material. Shredded Douglas fir bark is known for its many slivers, those who handle it with bare hands or walk on it with bare feet are likely to get splinters. Bark produced from hemlock or cedar is far less likely to produce splinters, and is commonly used as a covering for children's play areas.

== Properties and uses ==
Like many other types of mulch, barkdust is used in gardening and landscaping for its properties in affecting soil pH, in regulating the temperature of the underlying soil, and preventing water loss and erosion.

Barkdust increases soil acidity, and the decomposition of barkdust consumes nitrogen, especially when fine bark mulch is mixed in with soil; coarser barkdust laid on top of soil will extract nitrogen at a much slower rate. Barkdust is also effective at absorbing water and preventing water loss due to evaporation.

Barkdust is commonly used in landscaping around trees or shrubs. It is especially common in the Pacific Northwest where the tree species used to produce it are native. Barkdust is valued for its effectiveness at suppressing weeds; tree bark contains natural herbicides. In addition, many consider barkdust to be visually appealing.

As barkdust is less dense than other types of soil or mulch, and doesn't compress a great deal, it is often considerably softer than bare earth. As a result, it also finds applications as a playground surface. For playground applications, hemlock or cedar bark is most commonly used, as fir bark frequently produces splinters when handled by or trod upon with bare skin.

=== Commerce in barkdust ===
Barkdust is typically sold by the unit, with one unit of barkdust being equal to 200 cubic feet (7.41 cubic yards, or 5.66 m^{3}); such large quantities of barkdust are typically delivered by truck to a jobsite. Barkdust is often spread with a bark blower, a machine consisting of a supply of barkdust, a blower, and a long flexible tube which "sprays" the barkdust over the intended area. Use of a bark blower often results in a more consistent application of barkdust than spreading it by hand, as well as being much faster.

Smaller quantities of barkdust, typically 2 to 3 cubic feet (0.057 to 0.085 m^{3}) are sold prepackaged in home improvement and gardening retailers.

For landscaping applications, a layer of 2 to 3 inches (5.1 to 7.6 cm) is generally recommended. For use in playgrounds, a 12-inch (30 cm) layer is often recommended.

== See also ==
- Hydraulic debarker
- Tanbark
