= Hexylcaine =

Chemical compound

Clinical data
- ATC code: None

Pharmacokinetic data
- Elimination half-life: <10 minutes

Identifiers
- IUPAC name: 1-cyclohexylaminopropan-2-yl benzoate
- CAS Number: 532-77-4
- PubChem CID: 10770
- IUPHAR/BPS: 7196
- DrugBank: DB00473
- ChemSpider: 10315
- UNII: 511IU0826Z
- KEGG: C14172
- ChEMBL: ChEMBL1197
- CompTox Dashboard (EPA): DTXSID1047863

Chemical and physical data
- Formula: C_{16}H_{23}NO_{2}
- Molar mass: 261.365 g·mol^{−1}
- 3D model (JSmol): Interactive image
- SMILES: O=C(OC(CNC1CCCCC1)C)c2ccccc2
- InChI: InChI=1S/C16H23NO2/c1-13(12-17-15-10-6-3-7-11-15)19-16(18)14-8-4-2-5-9-14/h2,4-5,8-9,13,15,17H,3,6-7,10-12H2,1H3; Key:DKLKMKYDWHYZTD-UHFFFAOYSA-N

Hexylcaine hydrochloride, also called cyclaine (Merck) or osmocaine, is a short-acting local anesthetic. It acts by inhibiting sodium channel conduction. Overdose can lead to headache, tinnitus, numbness and tingling around the mouth and tongue, convulsions, inability to breathe, and decreased heart function.

== Synthesis ==
Synthesis: Patent:

The reductive amination between 1-Amino-2-propanol [78-96-6] (1) and cyclohexanone gives 1-Cyclohexylamino-2-propanol [103-00-4] (2). Treatment with benzoyl chloride gives the ester, completing the synthesis of Hexylcaine (3).
