= Propanolamines =

Class of chemical compounds

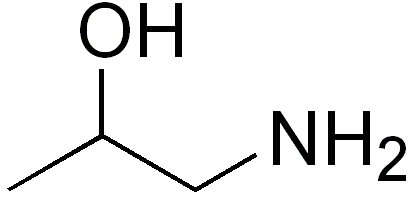
1-Amino-2-propanol

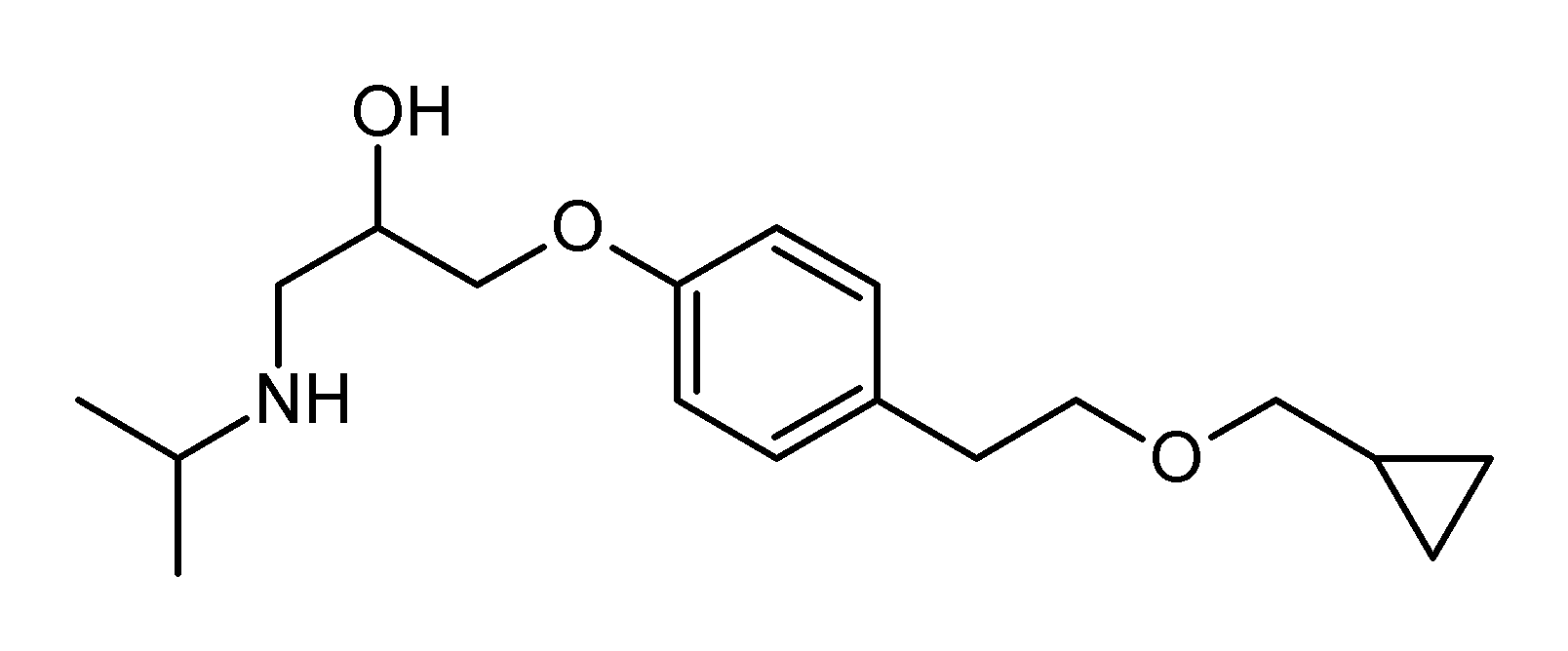
Betaxolol

Metoprolol

Nadolol

Pindolol

Propranolol

Timolol

Propanolamines are a class of chemical compounds, many of which are pharmaceutical drugs. They are amino alcohols that are derivatives of 1-amino-2-propanol.

Propanolamines include:

- Acebutolol
- Atenolol
- Betaxolol
- Bisoprolol
- Metoprolol
- Nadolol
- Penbutolol
- Phenylpropanolamine
- Pindolol
- Practolol
- Propranolol
- Ritodrine
- Timolol

== See also ==
- Propanolamine
- Phenoxyethylamine
