= Diisopropanolamine =

Names
- IUPAC name 1-(2-Hydroxypropylamino)propan-2-ol
- Other names DIPA; Bis(2-hydroxypropyl)amine

Identifiers
CAS Number	110-97-4
3D model (JSmol)	Interactive image
ChEBI	CHEBI:143266
ChemSpider	7795
ECHA InfoCard	100.003.474
PubChem CID	8086
UNII	0W44HYL8T5
CompTox Dashboard (EPA)	DTXSID8020179
- InChI: InChI=1S/C6H15NO2/c1-5(8)3-7-4-6(2)9/h5-9H,3-4H2,1-2H3 Key: LVTYICIALWPMFW-UHFFFAOYSA-N
- SMILES: CC(CNCC(C)O)O

Properties
Chemical formula	C_{6}H_{15}NO_{2}
Molar mass	133.191 g·mol^{−1}
Appearance	White solid
Density	0.99 g/cm^{3} (42 °C)
Melting point	42 °C (108 °F; 315 K)
Boiling point	249 °C (480 °F; 522 K)

Hazards
Flash point	135 °C (275 °F; 408 K)
- Except where otherwise noted, data are given for materials in their standard state (at 25 °C [77 °F], 100 kPa). Infobox references

Diisopropanolamine is a chemical compound with the molecular formula C_{6}H_{15}NO_{2}, used as an emulsifier, stabilizer, and chemical intermediate.

Diisopropanolamine can be prepared by the reaction of isopropanolamine or ammonia with propylene oxide.

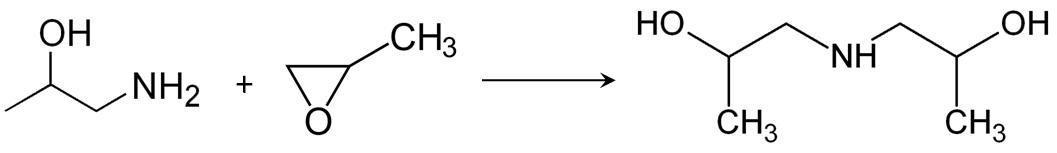
Synthesis of diisopropanolamine from isopropanolamine
