= Aza Paternò−Büchi reaction =

Chemical reaction

Aza Paternò−Büchi reaction involves an ππ* excited state of alkene reacting with a ground state imine. This strategy was developed by the laboratory Sivaguru and co-workers to overcome the shortcomings involving direct excitation of imines. Traditionally addition of excited imines to carbon-carbon double bonds involves making the imines as part of a carbocycle.

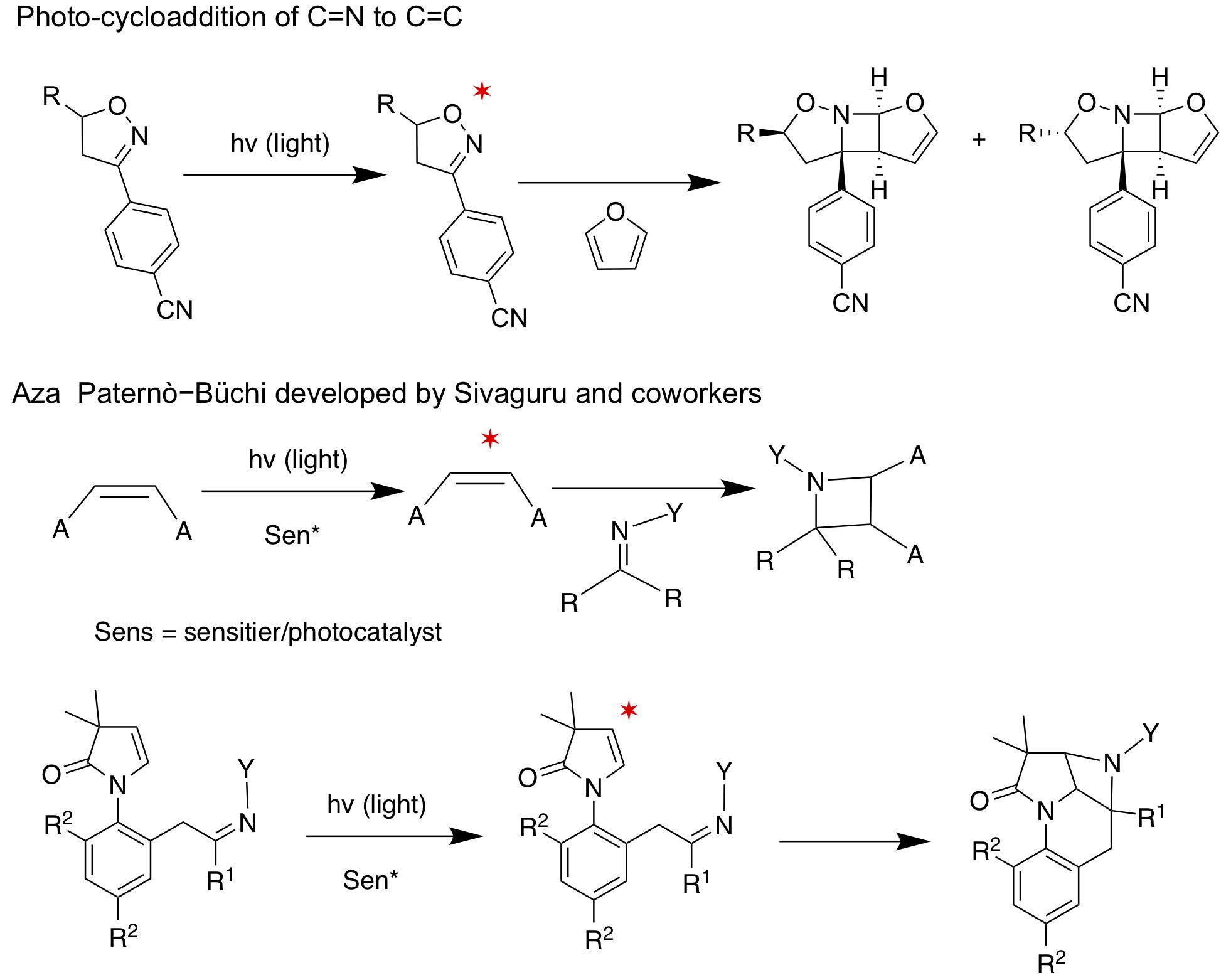
