= Aminoacetone =

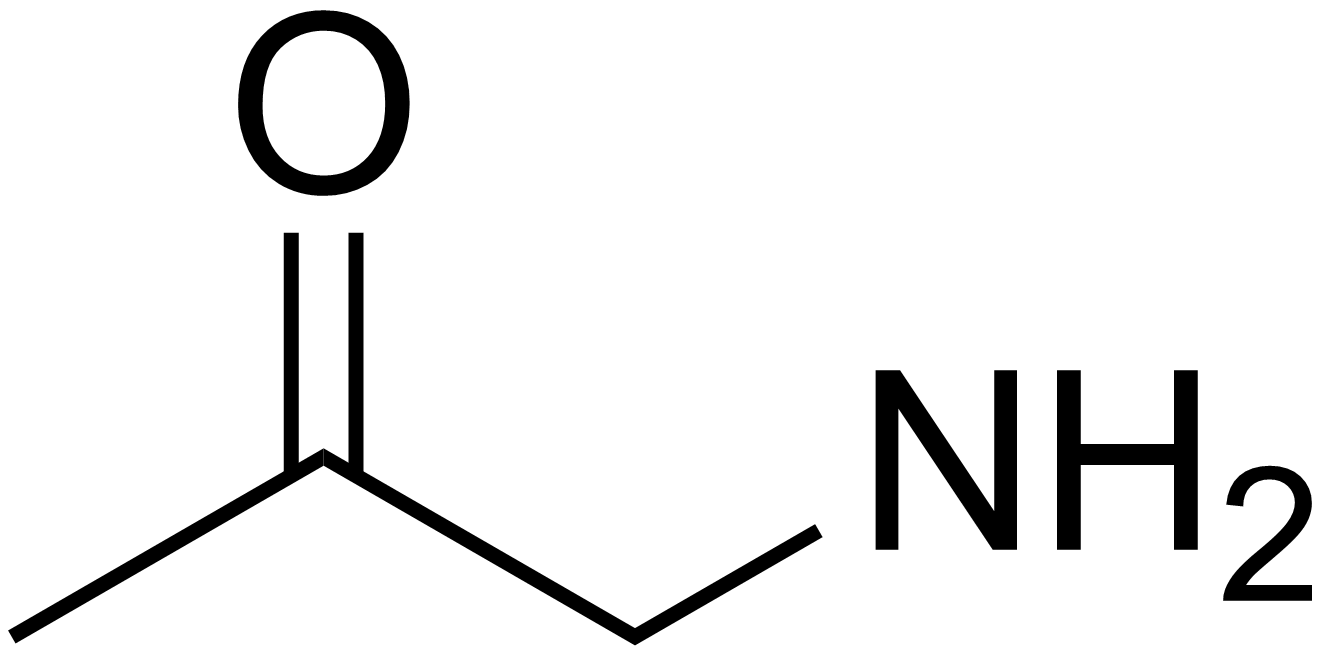

Names
- Preferred IUPAC name 1-Aminopropan-2-one
- Other names Aminoacetone alpha-Aminoacetone

Identifiers
CAS Number	298-08-8
3D model (JSmol)	Interactive image
ChEBI	CHEBI:17906
ChemSpider	210
ECHA InfoCard	100.236.907
KEGG	C01888
PubChem CID	215
UNII	ZB4ES38S4R
CompTox Dashboard (EPA)	DTXSID10183939
- InChI: InChI=1S/C3H7NO/c1-3(5)2-4/h2,4H2,1H3 Key: BCDGQXUMWHRQCB-UHFFFAOYSA-N; InChI=1/C3H7NO/c1-3(5)2-4/h2,4H2,1H3 Key: BCDGQXUMWHRQCB-UHFFFAOYAB
- SMILES: O=C(C)CN

Properties
Chemical formula	C_{3}H_{7}NO
Molar mass	73.095 g·mol^{−1}
- Except where otherwise noted, data are given for materials in their standard state (at 25 °C [77 °F], 100 kPa). verify (what is ?) Infobox references

Aminoacetone is the organic compound with the formula CH_{3}C(O)CH_{2}NH_{2}. Although stable in the gaseous form, once condensed it reacts with itself. The protonated derivative forms isolable salts, e.g. aminoacetone hydrochloride ([CH_{3}C(O)CH_{2}NH_{3}]Cl)). The semicarbazone of the hydrochloride is another bench-stable precursor. Aminoacetone is a metabolite that is implicated in the biosynthesis of methylglyoxal.

Aminoacetone is also produced during catabolism of the amino acid threonine. Threonine is first dehydrogenated to 2-amino-3-oxobutyrate, which is unstable and spontaneously decarboxylates to aminoacetone. Aminoacetone is then oxidized and deaminated, giving 2-oxopropanal (methylglyoxal), which is in turn oxidized to pyruvate. This pathway is the most important catabolic pathway of threonine in mammals.

== See also ==
- Propanolamines
- Aminoaldehydes and aminoketones
