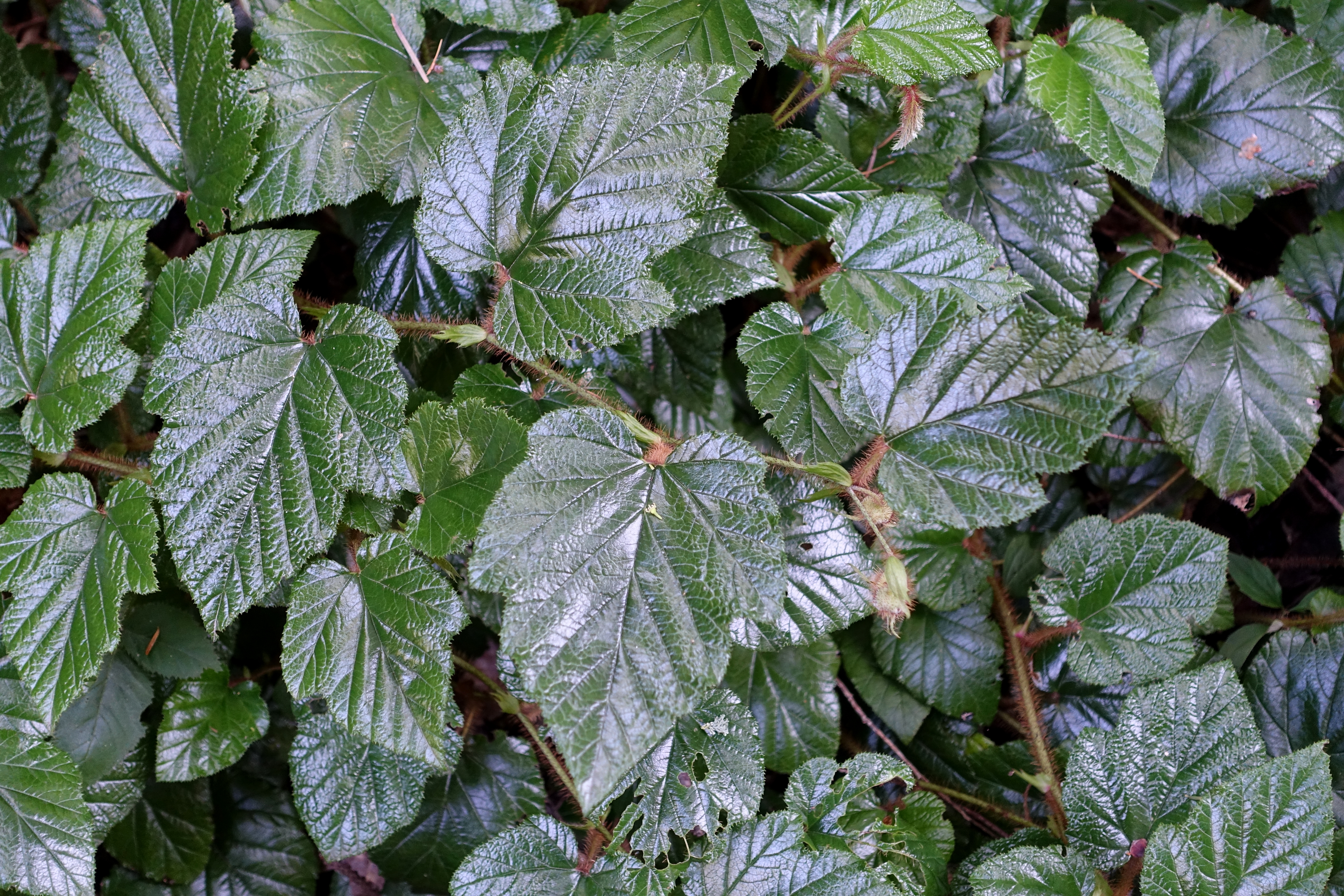

Scientific classification
- Kingdom: Plantae
- Clade: Tracheophytes
- Clade: Angiosperms
- Clade: Eudicots
- Clade: Rosids
- Order: Rosales
- Family: Rosaceae
- Genus: Rubus
- Species: R. tricolor

Binomial name
- Rubus tricolor Focke ex Prain

Synonyms
- Rubus polytrichus Franch.

= Rubus tricolor =

Species of shrub native to China

Rubus tricolor (/ˈruːbəs ˈtraɪkʌlər/) (Note: Pronunciation of Botanical Latin is variable.) is a species of prostrate shrub. Its common names include Chinese bramble, groundcover bramble, creeping bramble, Korean raspberry, Himalayan bramble, and groundcover raspberry. In Chinese, it is called 三色莓 ('sān sè méi ').

It usually forms a vigorously spreading, dense mat. The leaves are dark green above, pale green below, and stems have red bristles. It has white flowers in summer and edible red fruit. It is native to southwestern China. In cultivation, it is mainly used as groundcover.

== Description ==
The growth habit is prostrate/procumbent (trailing along the ground), but also climbing. It is usually stated to be an evergreen shrub, but sometimes said to be semi-evergreen or deciduous. This is because it is normally evergreen but can shed its leaves in severe winters. The long stems arch between 30 and 60 cm (12 and 24 in) high, although it may get higher if it grows over itself or other shrubs. The tips root when they touch the ground. It grows at a fast rate, spreading up to 2 m (6 1/2 ft) per year. It tends to form a dense, creeping mat of sprawling shrubs growing into each other.

The stems are tomentose, having dense yellow-brown bristles, but are not prickly. The leaf petioles are 1.5–4 cm long, and similarly bristled, with glandular hairs and persistent stipules approximately 1–2 cm by 4–8 mm.

The leaves are alternate, each arising at a different node. The leaf shape is simple (undivided blade) or slightly undulate (3–5 shallow lobes), ovate to oblong, with base subrounded to cordate and apex shortly acuminate. More simply, leaves have a heart-shaped base and a pointed tip. The margins of the leaf are described as unevenly coarsely sharply serrate (see: Leaf margin). Leaves are approximately 6–12 by 3–8 cm in size. On the abaxial (under) surface, the colour is yellow-grey and there are bristles, particularly on the veins which are raised. Adaxially (upper surface), the leaf is dark green, glossy and mostly glabrous (hairless) with only sparse bristles between veins.

The flowers are white, about 2.5 cm wide, solitary or in small clusters. The fruit are aggregate drupelets, bright red, and subglobose (imperfectly rounded), about 1.5–1.7 cm in diameter.

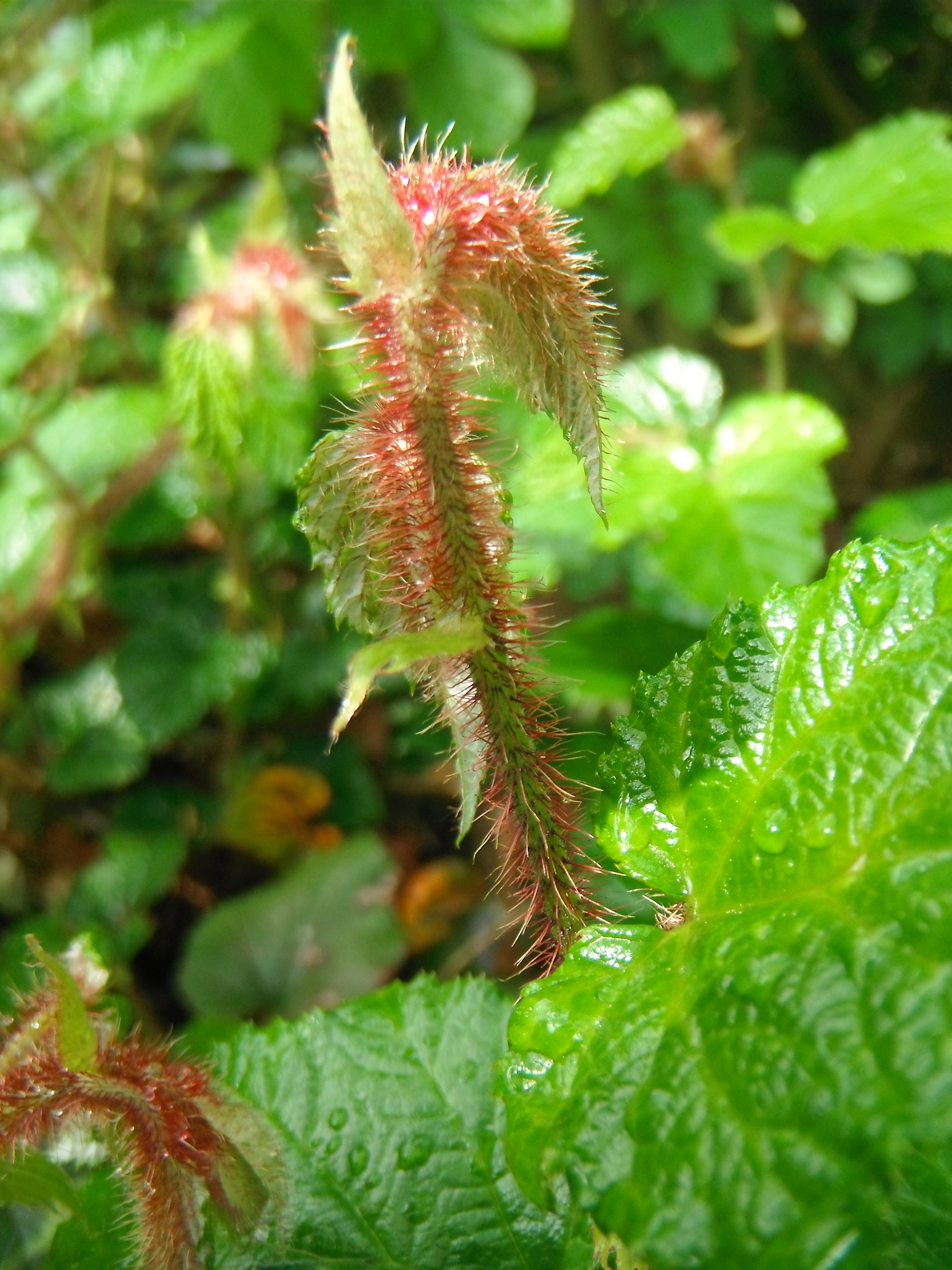
Growing tip of shoots

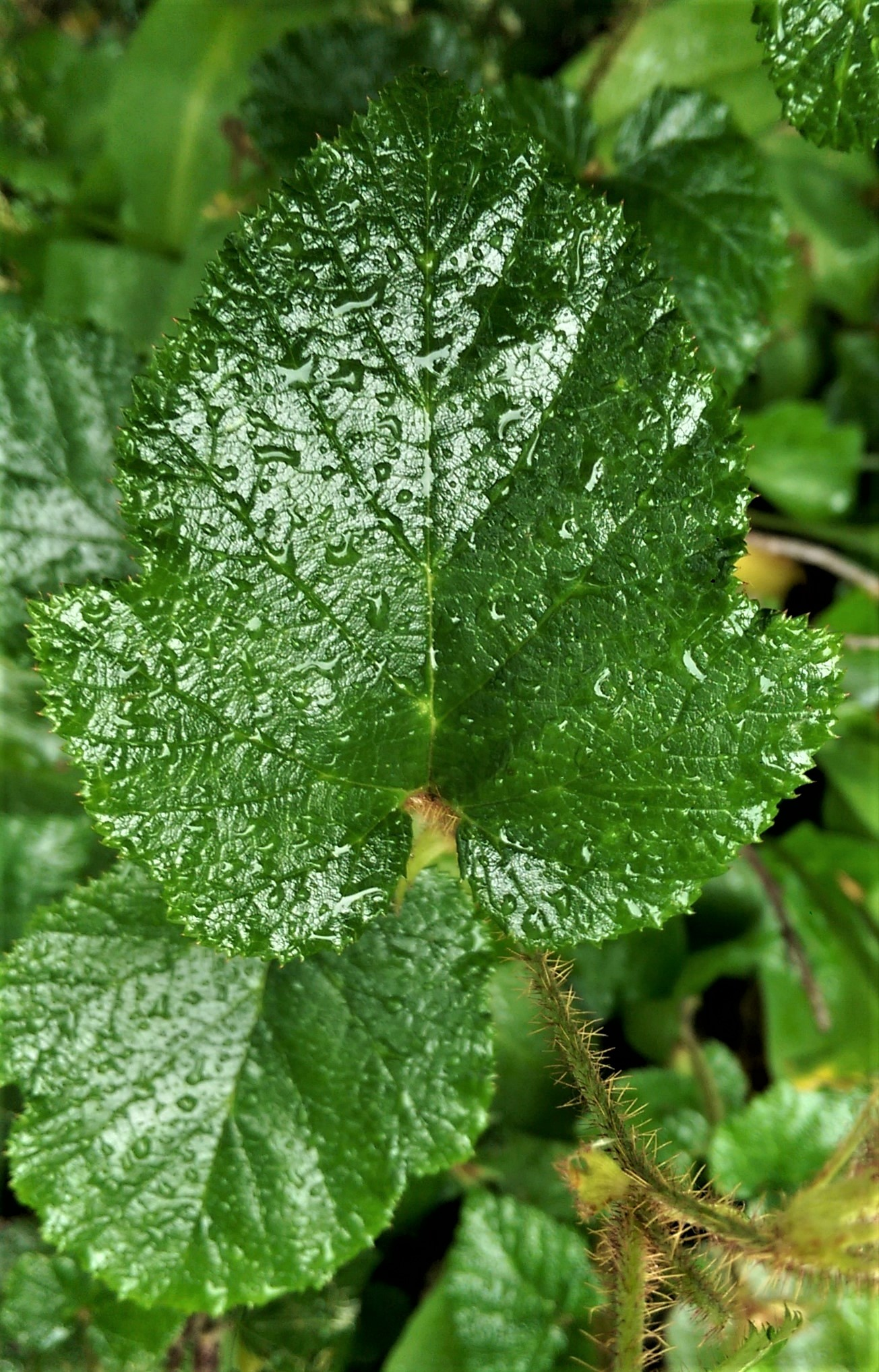
Leaf (abaxial surface)

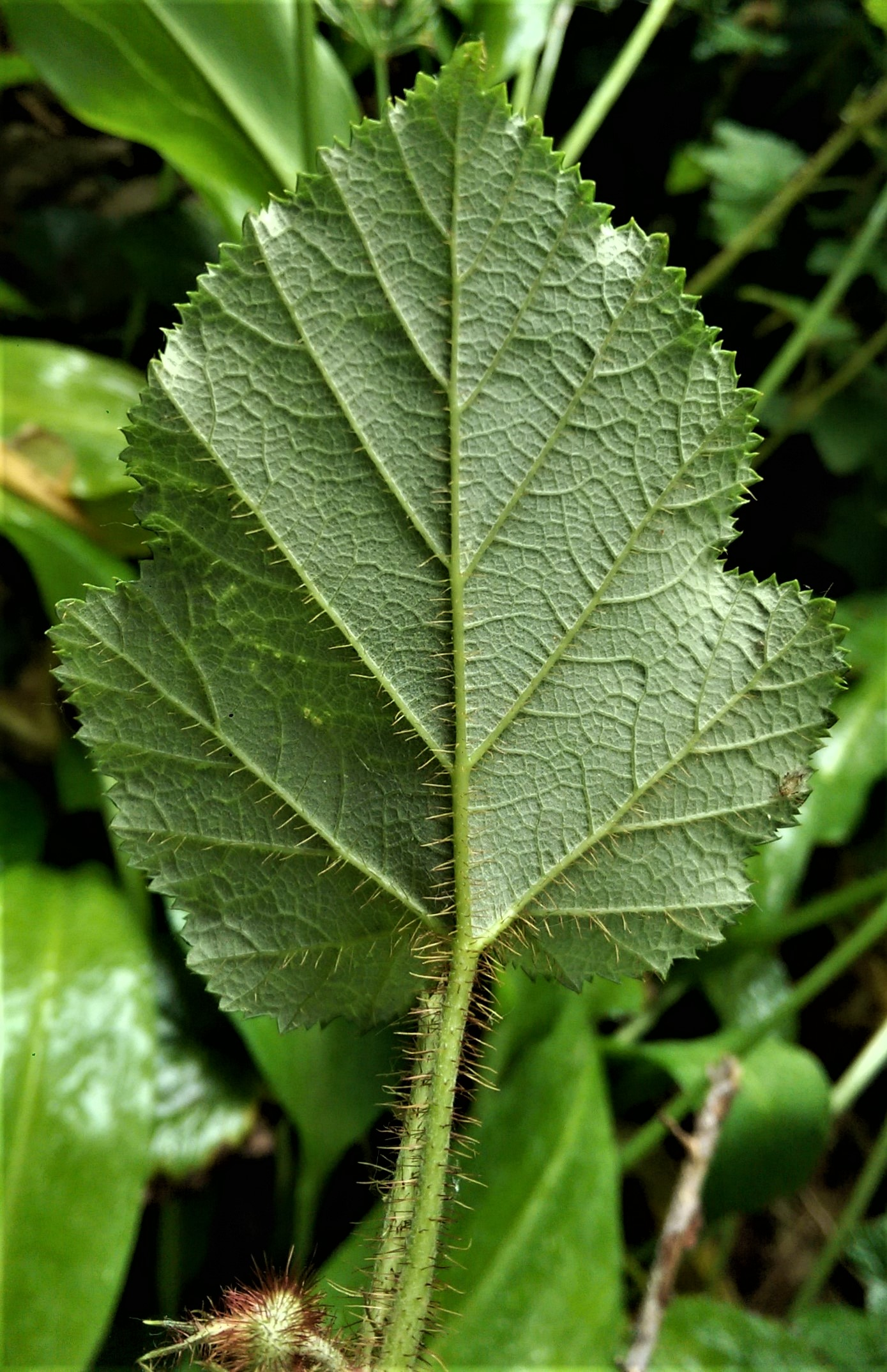
Leaf (adaxial surface)

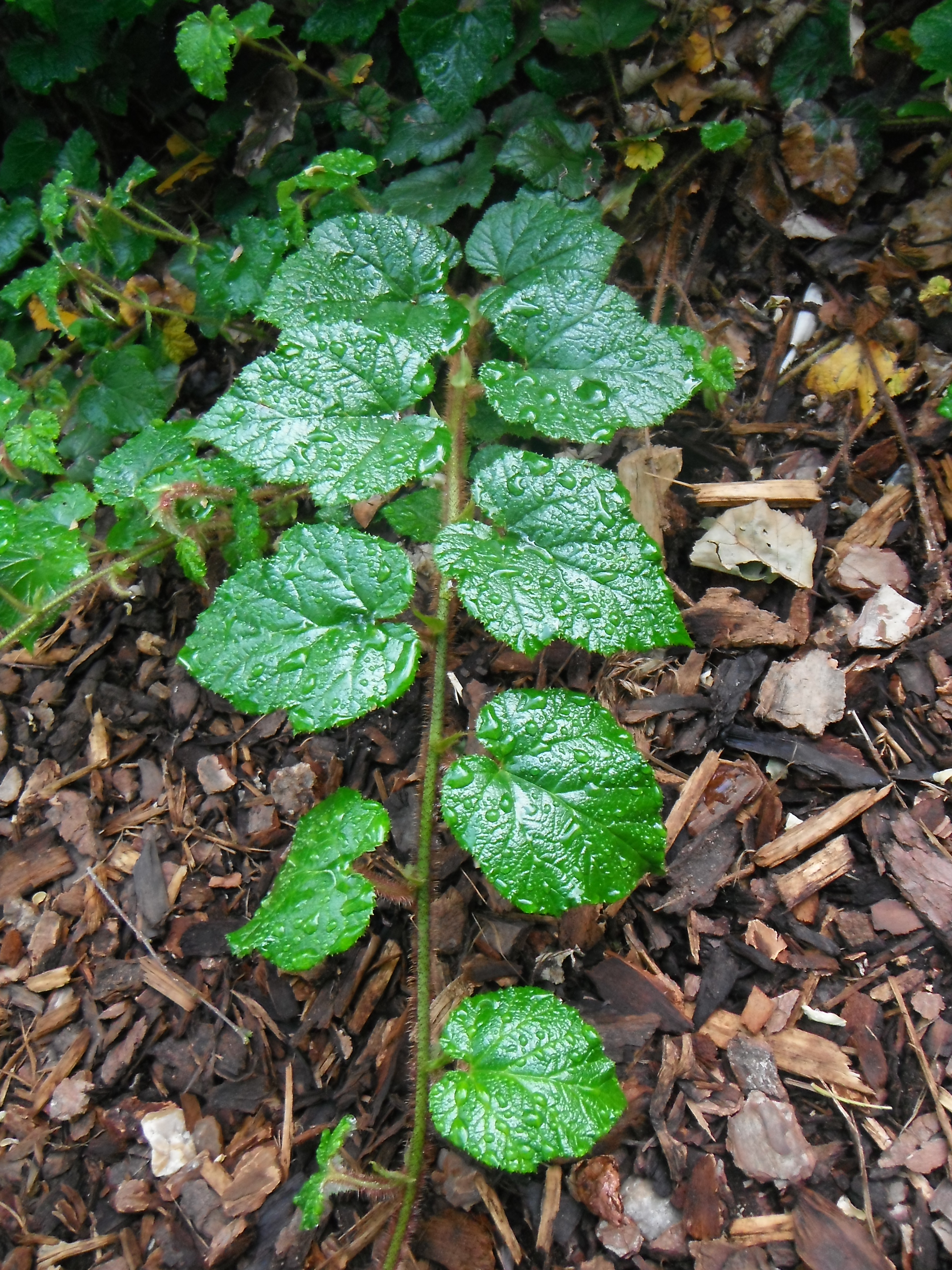
Stem with alternate leaves

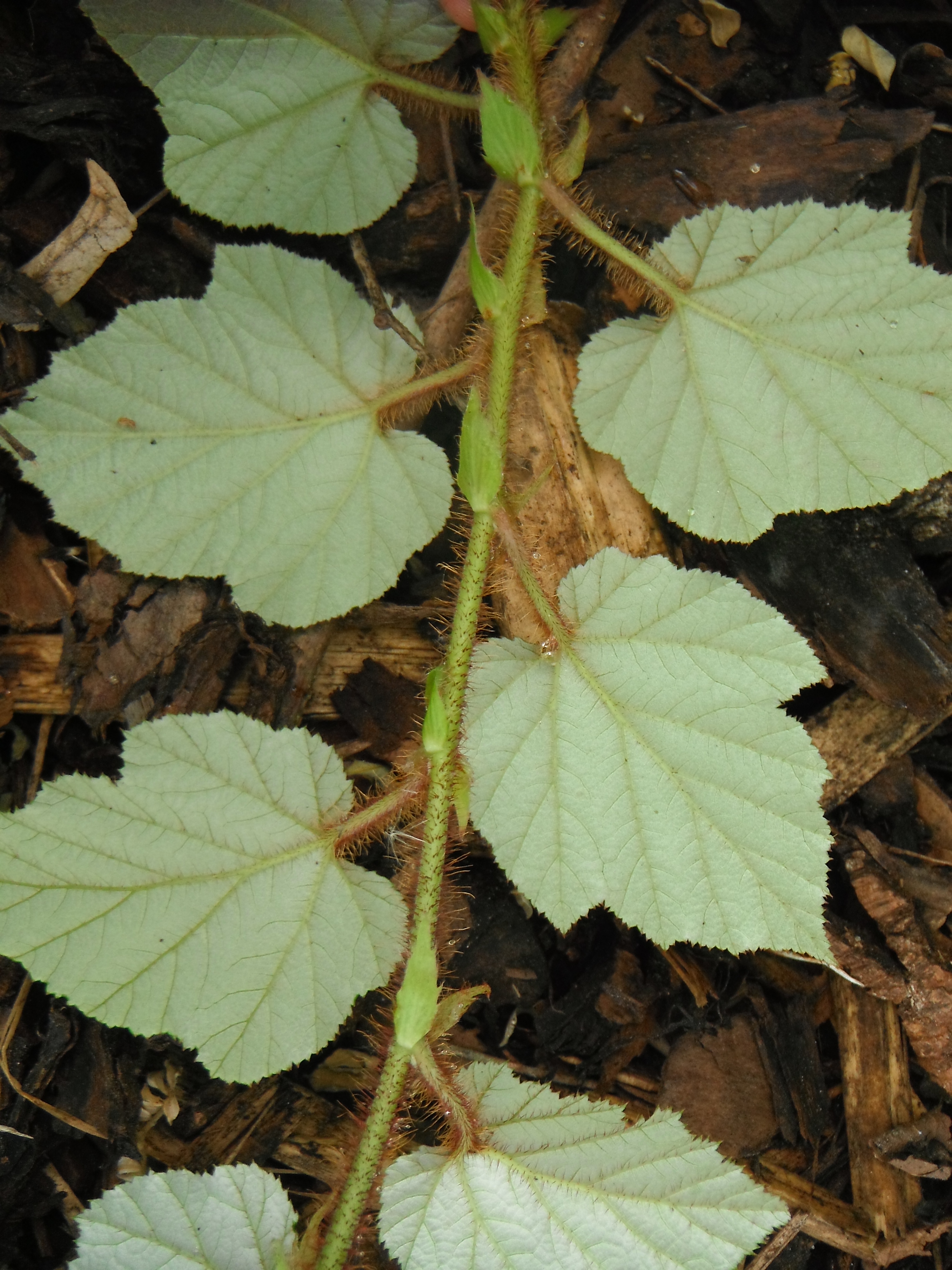
Stem (under surface)

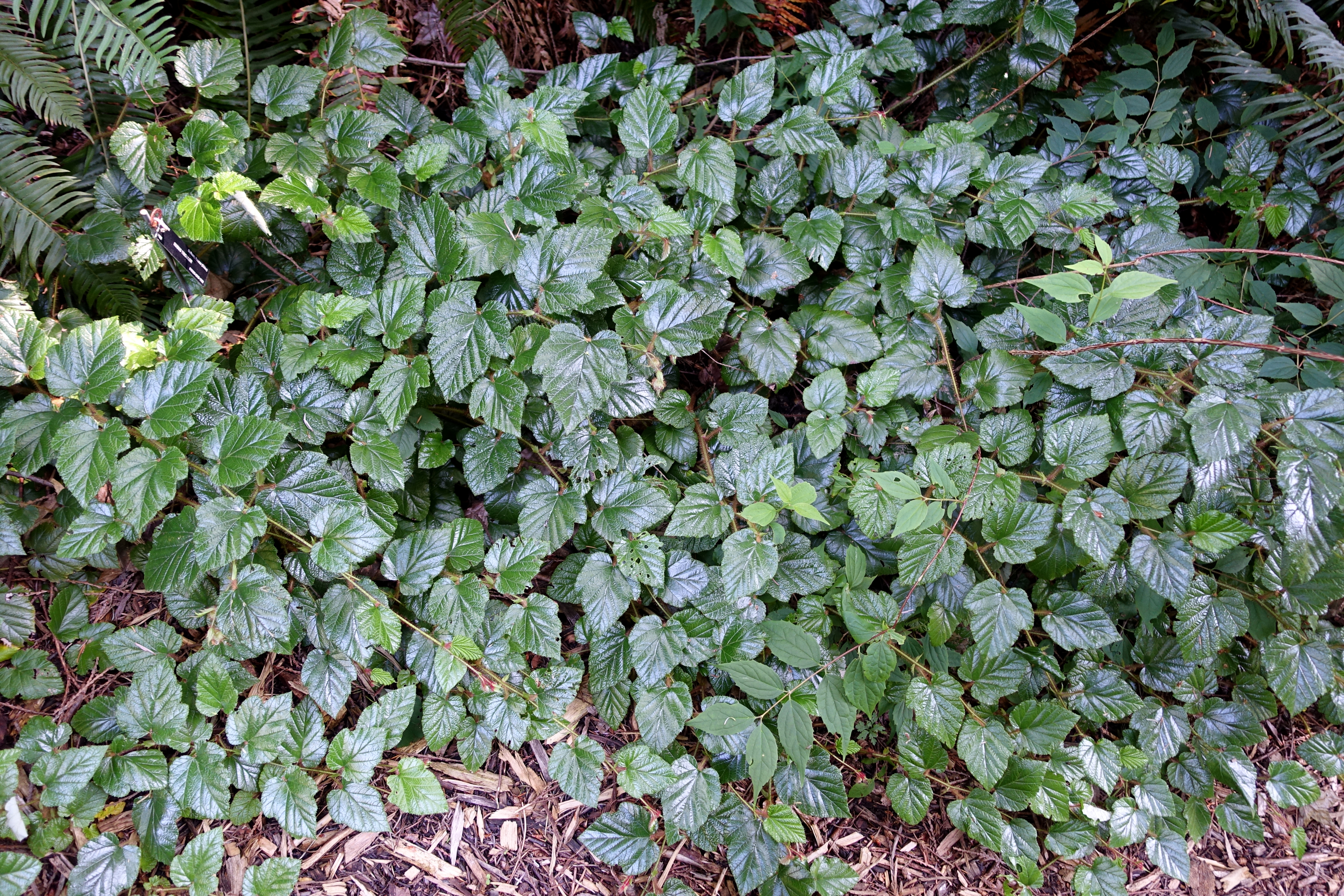
Typical growth habit, creeping dense mat

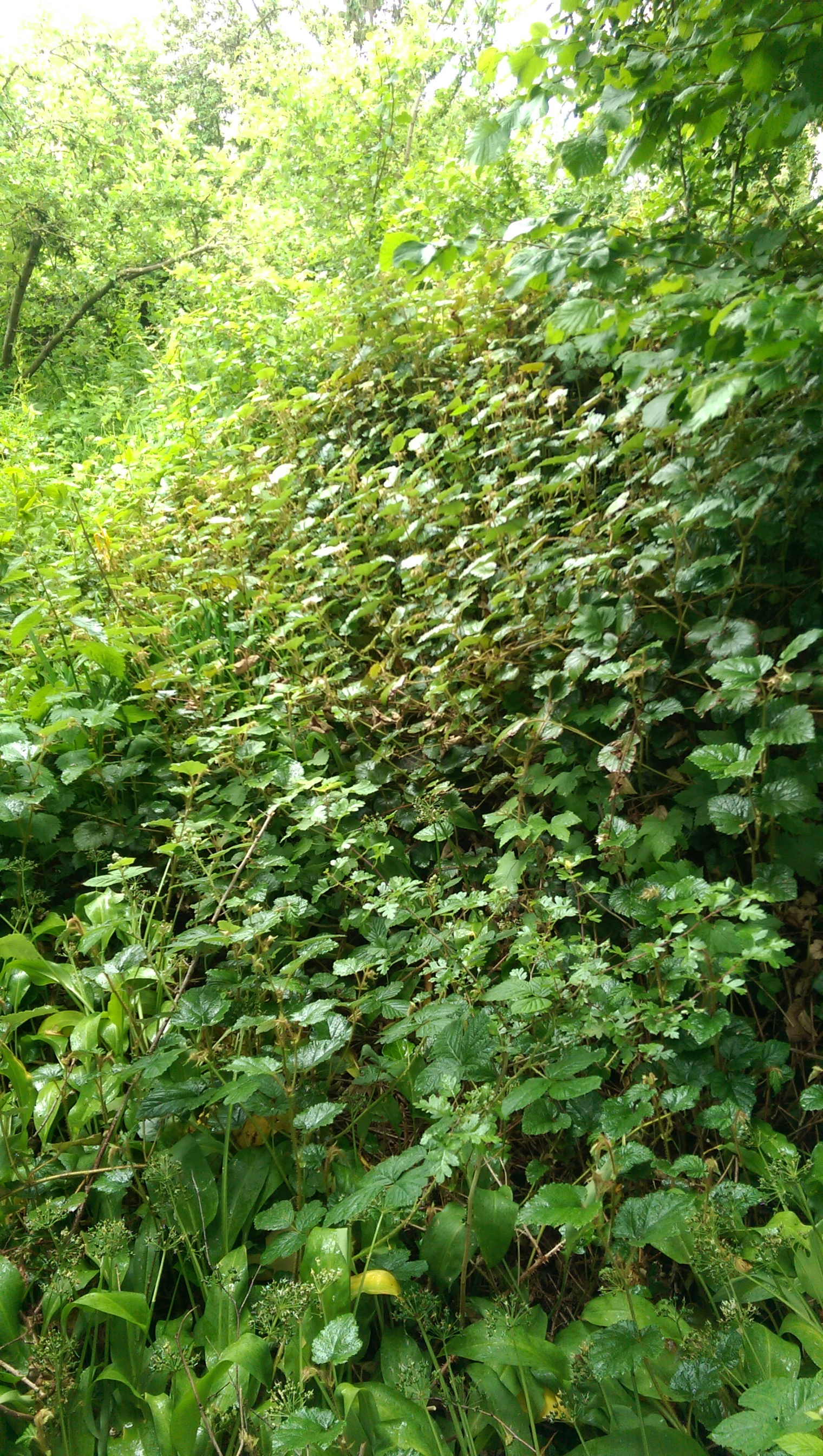
Forest garden groundcover

== Taxonomy ==
"Discovery" of R. tricolor is credited to Père Jean Marie Delavay, (Note: Presumably the people inhabiting the native range of the plant already being aware of it.) and first introduced from China to the west in 1908 by plant collector Ernest Henry Wilson. It was provisionally described as a species by Wilhelm Olbers Focke in 1910. David Prain formally recognized it as an accepted species in a supplement to Index Kewensis in 1913.

R. tricolor is a member of the genus Rubus which contains about 250 species, including the many different species of blackberries, raspberries and dewberries. Rubus is contained within the family Rosaceae (the "rose family").

Rubus means "bramble" or "bramble-like" in ancient Latin, and in Botanical Latin, tricolor means "three-coloured". Focke conferred that epithet based on the three colours of the plant: leaves green above, white below, and the red bristles of the stems and petioles.

== Distribution and habitat ==
The native range is Sichuan and Yunnan provinces in southwest China. It has been introduced into Great Britain and Ireland.

Native habitats are steep banks, slopes, forests, thickets and mountain scrub; at an elevation between 1,800–3,600 m (5,900–11,800 ft) above sea level.

== Ecology ==
=== Growth cycles ===
R. tricolor flowers in July. It is hermaphrodite (has both male and female organs), but is self-sterile (one plant will not fruit by itself). It is insect-pollinated, and the fruit ripens from mid-July to September. The plant fruits only occasionally. Many Rubus species rely on birds (and mammals) to eat the fruit, which contain seeds. Stomach acids scarify the hard outer shell of the seed, leaving the seed within intact. The seed is deposited in the animal droppings which helps to disperse the plant and may also act as a fertiliser (see: seed dispersal).

=== Pests and diseases ===
R. tricolor is generally not troubled by pests. Grey mould (Botrytis cinerea) may sometimes infect it. Honey fungus (Armillaria) is a problem for many Rubus species.

== Cultivation ==
R. tricolor is a tough plant, easily cultivated, and low maintenance. The species is cold hardy to about −15 °C (5 °F), meaning it can be grown in United States hardiness (USDA) zones 6–9, and it has a Royal Horticultural Society hardiness rating of "H5". R. tricolor will grow in well-drained soil but will tolerate moist soil as long as it is fairly well-drained. It tolerates a variety of soils such as chalky or sandy soils, but prefers loam; and tolerates acid, neutral, or alkaline soils. The plant grows best in partial shade but will also grow in deep shade or full sun.

It is widely used as a groundcover plant to suppress weeds, and protect soil. Since it is very vigorous, and fast-growing it is more suited to larger areas, and is said to be too vigorous for small gardens. Since it is tolerant of deep shade and has edible fruit, it has been recommended by proponents of forest gardening as a good groundcover plant under trees. Despite forming a dense groundcover, in the absence of a canopy layer R. tricolor will still be invaded by prolific seeding tree species such as ash (Fraxinus excelsior), sycamore (Acer pseudoplatanus), and elder (Sambucus nigra). Some advise against planting R. tricolor with any plants smaller than trees because it will tend to smother them.

Propagation is usually done by tip layering (in July), softwood cuttings (in summer), or hardwood cuttings (in winter). Division is usually done in early spring. Seed requires stratification to simulate exposure to cold weather and trigger germination. Some advise to sow in early autumn in a cold frame. Stored seed is sown early in the year in a cold frame. Stratification of 1 month at 3 °C (37 °F) is carried out (if sown later than February).

'Betty Ashburner' (Rubus x 'Betty Ashburner') is a hybrid of Rubus tricolor and R. calycinoides, (Note: Sometimes given as R. calycinoides, R. pentalobus or R. rolfe, this parent of the hybrid is correctly referred to as R. hayata-koidzumii.) sometimes referred to as "Creeping Raspberry", although that term is also used to refer to a few other Rubus species, including the parents of the hybrid.

== Uses ==
The fruits are edible raw or cooked and are generally treated in the same manner as raspberries. They are usually eaten raw because they have limited shelf life once harvested. The fruit can also be made into jam.

A purple-blue dye can be made from the fruit.

The flowers also provide forage for bees.
