= Tipper =

Tipper can refer to:

== People ==
- Alfred Tipper (1867–1944), Australian showman, competitive and endurance cyclist and outsider artist
- Benjamin Tipper (1896–1970), English cricketer
- Constance Tipper (1894–1995), English metallurgist and crystallographer
- David Tipper (born c. 1976), British composer and producer specializing in electronic music, known mononymously as Tipper
- Dominique Tipper (born 1987 or 1988), British actress, singer-songwriter and dancer
- Edward Tipper (1921–2017), American World War II paratrooper
- Jim Tipper (1849–1895), American baseball player
- John Tipper (mathematician) (1616–1713), English mathematician
- John Tipper (speed skater) (born 1944), English Olympic speedskater
- Richard Tipper or Tupper (fl. 1709–after 1742), Irish scribe
- Tipper Gore (born 1948), author, photographer, former second lady of the United States, and the estranged wife of Al Gore

== Other uses ==
- Tipper, a beater for the bodhrán or Gaelic drum
- Tipper, a dumper
- Tipper, a civil parish in County Kildare, Ireland
- Tom Tipper, a postman in The Railway Series by the Rev. W. Awdry and the spin-off series Thomas and Friends

== See also ==
- Tippa Irie (born Anthony Henry, 1965), British reggae singer and DJ
