= 3-Amino-1-propanol =

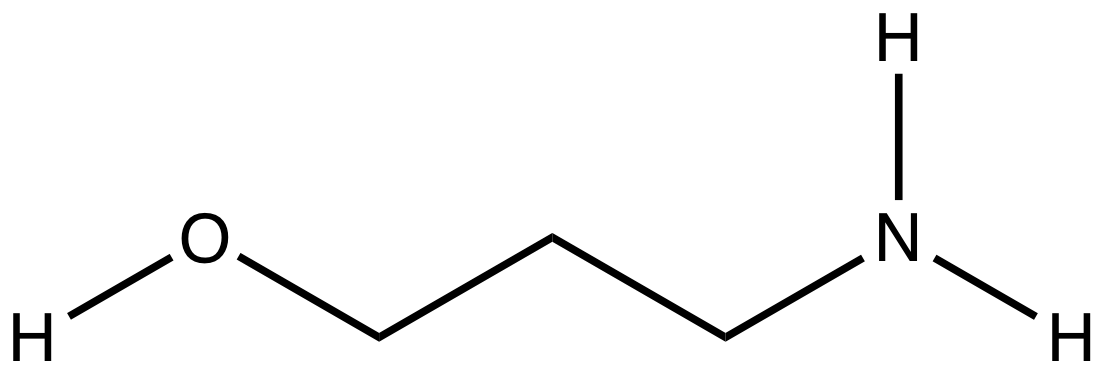

Names
- Preferred IUPAC name 3-Aminopropan-1-ol
- Other names 1-Amino-3-propanol

Identifiers
CAS Number	156-87-6
3D model (JSmol)	Interactive image
ChEBI	CHEBI:143408
ChEMBL	ChEMBL115530
ChemSpider	8733
ECHA InfoCard	100.005.333
EC Number	205-864-4
PubChem CID	9086
UNII	YMA7C44XGY
UN number	2735
CompTox Dashboard (EPA)	DTXSID0059746
- InChI: InChI=1S/C3H9NO/c4-2-1-3-5/h5H,1-4H2 Key: WUGQZFFCHPXWKQ-UHFFFAOYSA-N
- SMILES: C(CN)CO

Properties
Chemical formula	C_{3}H_{9}NO
Molar mass	75.111 g·mol^{−1}
Appearance	colorless liquid
Density	0.9824 g/cm^{3}
Melting point	12.4 °C (54.3 °F; 285.5 K)
Boiling point	187–188 °C (369–370 °F; 460–461 K)

Hazards
- GHS labelling
Pictograms	(GHS05: Corrosive) (GHS07: Exclamation mark)
Signal word	Danger
Hazard statements	H302, H312, H314
Precautionary statements	P260, P264, P270, P280, P301+P312, P301+P330+P331, P302+P352, P303+P361+P353, P304+P340, P305+P351+P338, P310, P312, P321, P322, P330, P363, P405, P501
- Except where otherwise noted, data are given for materials in their standard state (at 25 °C [77 °F], 100 kPa). Infobox references

3-Amino-1-propanol is the organic compound with the formula HOCH_{2}CH_{2}CH_{2}NH_{2}. A colorless liquid, the compound is one of the simplest aminopropanols.
