= Alaninol =

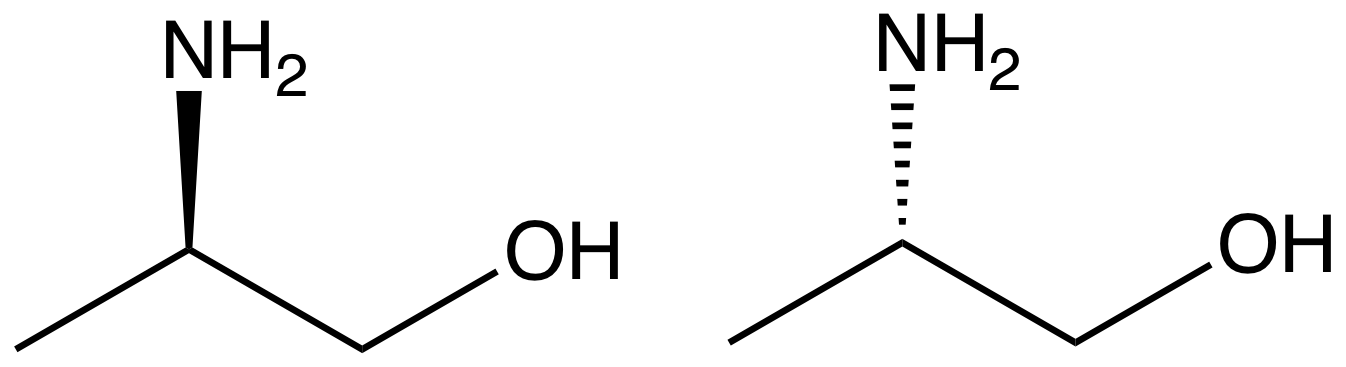

Names
- Preferred IUPAC name 2-Aminopropan-1-ol

Identifiers
CAS Number	racemate: 6168-72-5; (S): 2749-11-3; (R): 35320-23-1
3D model (JSmol)	(S): Interactive image
ChEBI	(S): CHEBI:78502
ChEMBL	(S): ChEMBL1229871
ChemSpider	(S): 72545
ECHA InfoCard	100.025.644
EC Number	(S): 220-388-7
PubChem CID	(S): 80307
UNII	racemate: E8V71RA4B5; (S): V403GH89L1; (R): 770ZI70L3Q
CompTox Dashboard (EPA)	racemate: DTXSID50865762
- InChI: (S): InChI=1S/C3H9NO/c1-3(4)2-5/h3,5H,2,4H2,1H3/t3-/m0/s1 Key: BKMMTJMQCTUHRP-VKHMYHEASA-N
- SMILES: (S): CC(CO)N

Properties
Chemical formula	C_{3}H_{9}NO
Molar mass	75.111 g·mol^{−1}
Appearance	colorless solid
Melting point	96 °C racemate 72-72 °C for R or S
Boiling point	174.5 °C (346.1 °F; 447.6 K)

Hazards
- GHS labelling
Pictograms	(GHS05: Corrosive)
Signal word	Danger
Hazard statements	H314
Precautionary statements	P260, P264, P280, P301+P330+P331, P303+P361+P353, P304+P340, P305+P351+P338, P310, P321, P363, P405, P501
- Except where otherwise noted, data are given for materials in their standard state (at 25 °C [77 °F], 100 kPa). Infobox references

Alaninol is the organic compound with the formula CH_{3}CH(NH_{2})CH_{2}OH. A colorless solid, the compound is classified as an amino alcohol. It can be generated by converting the carboxylic group of alanine to an alcohol with a strong reducing agent such as lithium aluminium hydride. The compound is chiral, and a precursor to numerous chiral ligands used in asymmetric catalysis. The compound is an example of a 1,2-ethanolamine.
