= 1-Aminopropan-2-ol =

Names
- Preferred IUPAC name 1-Aminopropan-2-ol
- Other names: 1-Amino-2-propanol; Isopropanolamine; MIPA; Threamine

Identifiers
CAS Number	78-96-6; (R): 2799-16-8; (S): 2799-17-9
3D model (JSmol)	(R): Interactive image; (S): Interactive image
ChEBI	CHEBI:19030
ChEMBL	ChEMBL326602
ChemSpider	3; (R): 388968; (S): 5641722
ECHA InfoCard	100.001.057
EC Number	201-162-7; (R): 220-532-9; (S): 220-533-4
KEGG	C05771
PubChem CID	4; (R): 439938; (S): 7311736
UNII	UE40BY1BZW
CompTox Dashboard (EPA)	DTXSID9021764
- InChI: InChI=1S/C3H9NO/c1-3(5)2-4/h3,5H,2,4H2,1H3 Key: HXKKHQJGJAFBHI-UHFFFAOYSA-N; (R): InChI=1S/C3H9NO/c1-3(5)2-4/h3,5H,2,4H2,1H3/t3-/m1/s1 Key: HXKKHQJGJAFBHI-GSVOUGTGSA-N; (S): InChI=1S/C3H9NO/c1-3(5)2-4/h3,5H,2,4H2,1H3/t3-/m0/s1 Key: HXKKHQJGJAFBHI-VKHMYHEASA-N
- SMILES: OC(C)CN; (R): O[C@H](C)CN; (S): O[C@@H](C)CN

Properties
Chemical formula	C_{3}H_{9}NO
Molar mass	75.111 g·mol^{−1}
Appearance	liquid
Odor	ammonia-like
Density	0.973 g/mL (18 °C)
Melting point	1.74 °C (35.13 °F; 274.89 K)
Boiling point	159.46 °C (319.03 °F; 432.61 K)
Solubility in water	soluble
Solubility	soluble in alcohol, ether, acetone, benzene, CCl_{4}
Refractive index (n_{D})	1.4479

Hazards
NFPA 704 (fire diamond)	2 2 0
Flash point	77 °C (171 °F; 350 K)
Autoignition temperature	374 °C (705 °F; 647 K)
- Lethal dose or concentration (LD, LC)
LD_{50} (median dose)	4.26 g/kg (rat, oral)
- Except where otherwise noted, data are given for materials in their standard state (at 25 °C [77 °F], 100 kPa). Infobox references

1-Aminopropan-2-ol is the organic compound with the formula CH_{3}CH(OH)CH_{2}NH_{2}. It is an amino alcohol. The term isopropanolamine may also refer more generally to the additional homologs diisopropanolamine (DIPA) and triisopropanolamine (TIPA).

1-Aminopropan-2-ol is chiral. It can be prepared by the addition of aqueous ammonia to propylene oxide.

== Biosynthesis ==
(R)-1-Aminopropan-2-ol is one of the components incorporated in the biosynthesis of cobalamin. The O-phosphate ester is produced from threonine by the enzyme Threonine-phosphate decarboxylase.

== Applications ==
The isopropanolamines are used as buffers. They are good solubilizers of oil and fat, so they are used to neutralize fatty acids and sulfonic acid-based surfactants. Racemic 1-aminopropan-2-ol is typically used in metalworking fluid, waterborne coatings, personal care products, and in the production of titanium dioxide and polyurethanes. It is an intermediate in the synthesis of a variety of pharmaceutical drugs.

(R)-1-aminopropan-2-ol is metabolised to aminoacetone by the enzyme (R)-aminopropanol dehydrogenase.

Synthesis of Hexylcaine is one application.
