= Renal artery stenosis =

Narrowing of the renal (kidney) arteries

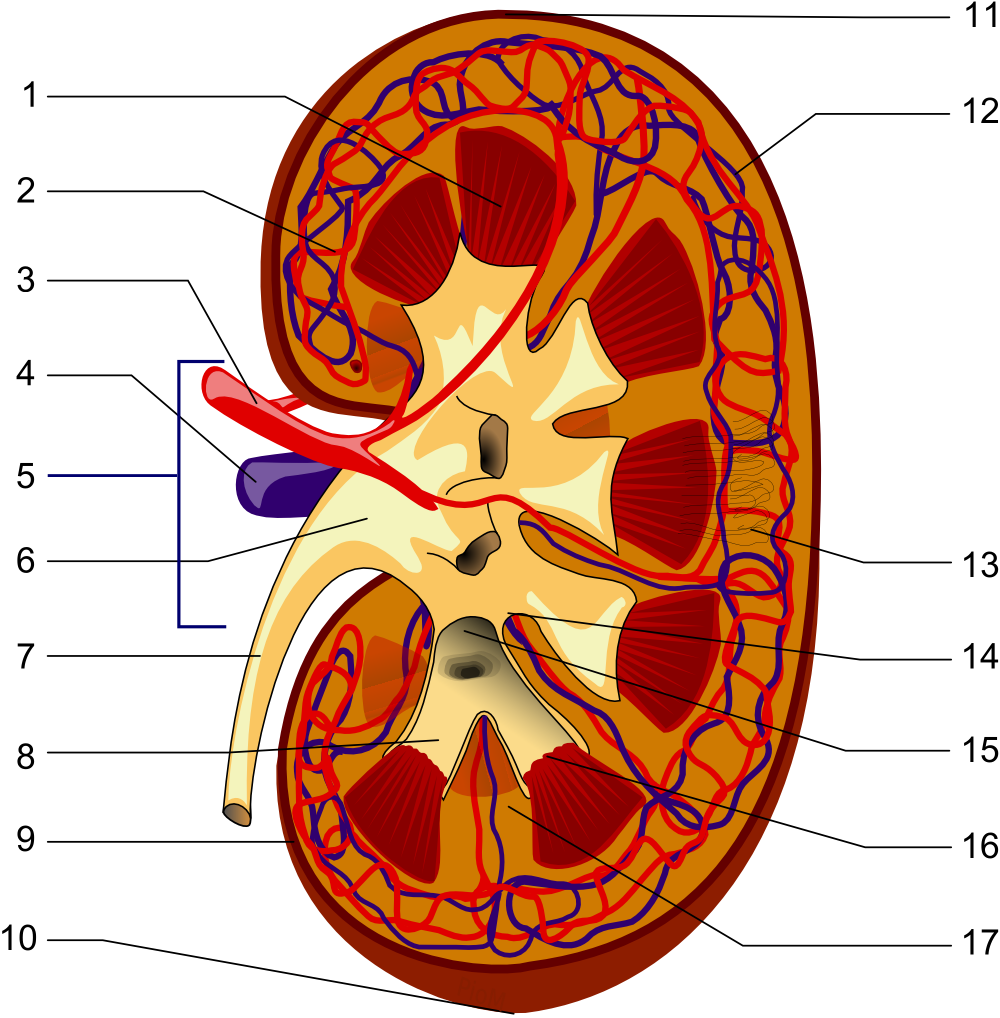
- 1. Renal pyramid; 2. Interlobular artery; 3. Renal artery; 4. Renal vein; 5. Renal hilum; 6. Renal pelvis; 7. Ureter; 8. Minor calyx; 9. Renal capsule; 10. Inferior renal capsule; 11. Superior renal capsule; 12. Interlobar vein; 13. Nephron; 14. Renal sinus; 15. Major calyx; 16. Renal papilla; 17. Renal column
- Specialty: Nephrology
- Risk factors: Smoking, High blood pressure
- Diagnostic method: Captopril challenge test, Doppler ultrasound
- Treatment: ACE inhibitors

Renal artery stenosis (RAS) is the narrowing of one or more of the renal arteries, which can reduce kidney blood flow and may lead to hypertension and kidney disease. RAS is often caused by atherosclerosis (approximately 90%) which is related to hypertension, high cholesterol, and smoking, or other rarer disease processes such as fibromuscular dysplasia (approximately 10%). The narrowing of one or more renal arteries can impede blood flow to a kidney, which the kidney can interpret as hypoperfusion (decreased or inadequate blood flow to an organ or tissue), and through a cascade of events involving activation of the Renin Angiotensin Aldosterone System (RAAS) may result in renovascular hypertension – a secondary type of high blood pressure. Possible complications of renal artery stenosis are chronic kidney disease, kidney atrophy, resistant hypertension, cardiovascular events such as coronary artery disease and stroke, and fluid retention, often manifesting as lower extremity edema.

== Signs and symptoms ==
Most cases of renal artery stenosis are asymptomatic, but may manifest with signs of fluid retention, especially lower extremity edema. The main complication of RAS is resistant hypertension, or high blood pressure that cannot be controlled despite the concurrent use of three or more different classes of antihypertensive medications. Chronic kidney disease may develop if one or both kidneys do not receive adequate blood flow over time. A rare complication of RAS is flash pulmonary edema (prevalence of 10-30% of patients), often referred to as Pickering Syndrome. This complication occurs more commonly in those with bilateral RAS, and is characterized by the rapid accumulation of fluid in the lungs and possibly leading to respiratory failure.

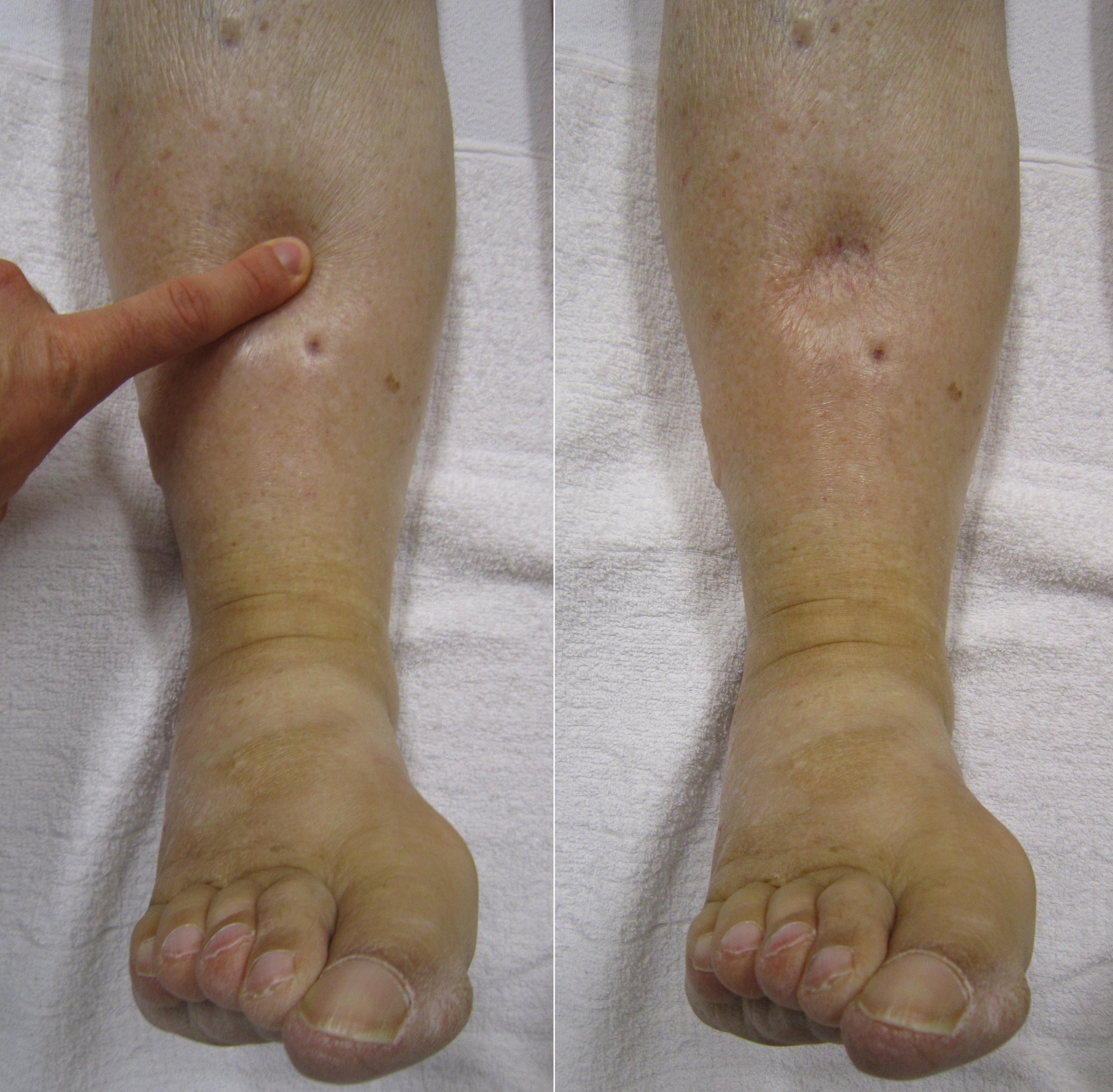
"Pitting" lower extremity edema

== Risk factors ==
Risk factors strongly associated with atherosclerotic RAS include HTN, age (>60), sex (male), smoking, diabetes, and cardiovascular diseases, such as PVD and a history of myocardial infarction. Whereas FMD-related RAS is more common in females (~90% of cases).

== Pathophysiology ==
As stated above, renal artery stenosis is most often caused by atherosclerosis, which causes the renal arteries to harden and narrow due to the build-up of plaque. This is known as atherosclerotic renovascular disease, which accounts for about 90% of cases. This narrowing of renal arteries decreases blood flow to the kidney. As less blood flows through the kidneys, specialized cells within the walls of the afferent arterioles of the kidney called Juxtaglomerular cells act as miniature stretch receptors to sense this low blood pressure and secrete the enzyme Renin, which begins the activation of the Renin Angiotensin Aldosterone System (RAAS). The liver produces the precursor angiotensinogen, which is converted into angiotensin I by renin (secreted by the kidneys). Angiotensin I is then converted into the active hormone, angiotensin II, primarily by angiotensin-converting enzyme (ACE), largely located in the lungs. Angiotensin II exerts widespread vasoconstriction and triggers the release of Aldosterone, which essentially prompts the kidneys to retain sodium and water, ultimately leading to increased blood pressure. Therefore, since people with RAS have chronic narrowing of their renal arteries, they may have chronic resistant high blood pressure because their RAAS is constantly activated.

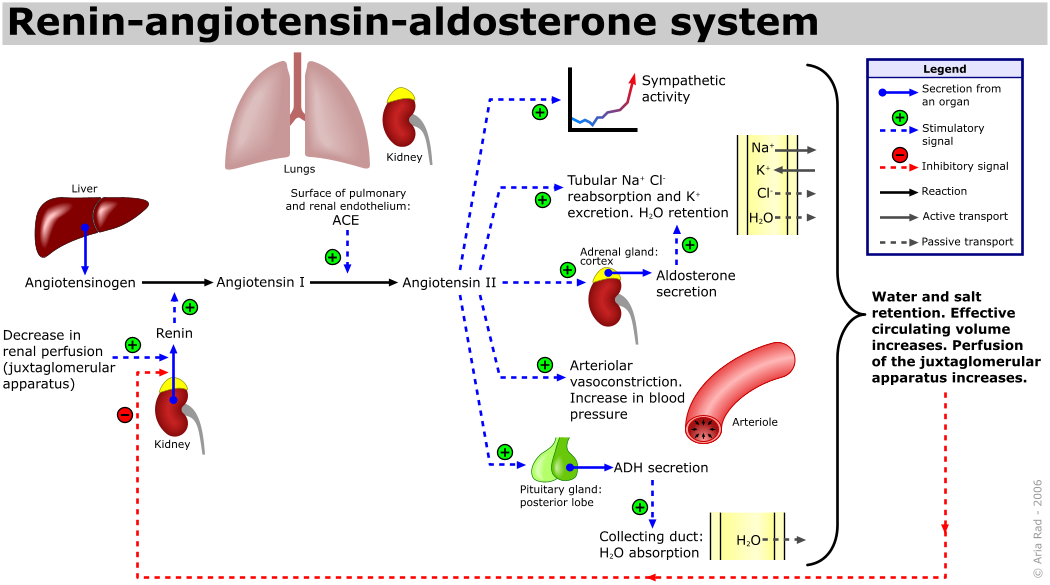
Renin-angiotensin-aldosterone system

Renal Artery Stenosis, Courtesy of Mayo Clinic

== Pathophysiological sequelae ==
The pathophysiology of renal artery stenosis leads to changes in the structure of the kidney that are most noticeable in the tubular tissue.

Changes include:

- Fibrosis
- Tubular cell size (decrease)
- Thickening of Bowman capsule
- Tubulosclerosis
- Glomerular capillary tuft (atrophy)

== Diagnosis ==
Assessment of Kidneys with Renal Artery Stenosis taken by Magnetic Resonance Angiography.

A variety of techniques along with a clinical prediction rule can be used to help guide the diagnosis of RAS. Patients may present to a cardiologist or nephrologist with resistant high blood pressure, who may start with a renal ultrasound (US) to look for signs of possible RAS, such as atrophy or a shrunken kidney due to chronic hypoperfusion. Although less sensitive, physical exam with auscultation using a stethoscope may reveal a renal bruit. Following US, confirmatory testing is usually done via a doppler or angiography, in part depending on if the patient has adequate kidney function to tolerate the contrast used in angiography.

Among the diagnostic techniques are:

- Doppler ultrasound study of the kidneys
- Refractory hypertension
- Auscultation (with stethoscope) - bruit ("rushing" sound)
- Captopril challenge test
- Captopril test dose effect on the differential renal function as measured by MAG3 scan.
- Renal artery arteriogram.

The specific criteria for renal artery stenosis on Doppler are an acceleration time of greater than 70 milliseconds, an acceleration index of less than 300 cm/sec² and a velocity ratio of the renal artery to aorta of greater than 3.5.

== Treatment ==
=== Atherosclerotic renal artery stenosis ===
It is initially treated with medications, including diuretics, and medications for blood pressure control. When high-grade renal artery stenosis is documented and blood pressure cannot be controlled with medication, or if renal function deteriorates, surgery may be resorted to. The most commonly used procedure is a minimally-invasive angioplasty with or without stenting. Essentially, stenting is a procedure in which stents (tiny, expandable mesh tubes) are placed to hold open an artery and potentially improve blood flow. It is unclear if this approach yields better results than the use of medications alone. It is a relatively safe procedure. If all else fails and the kidney is thought to be worsening hypertension and revascularization with angioplasty or surgery does not work, then surgical removal of the affected kidney (nephrectomy) may significantly improve high blood pressure.

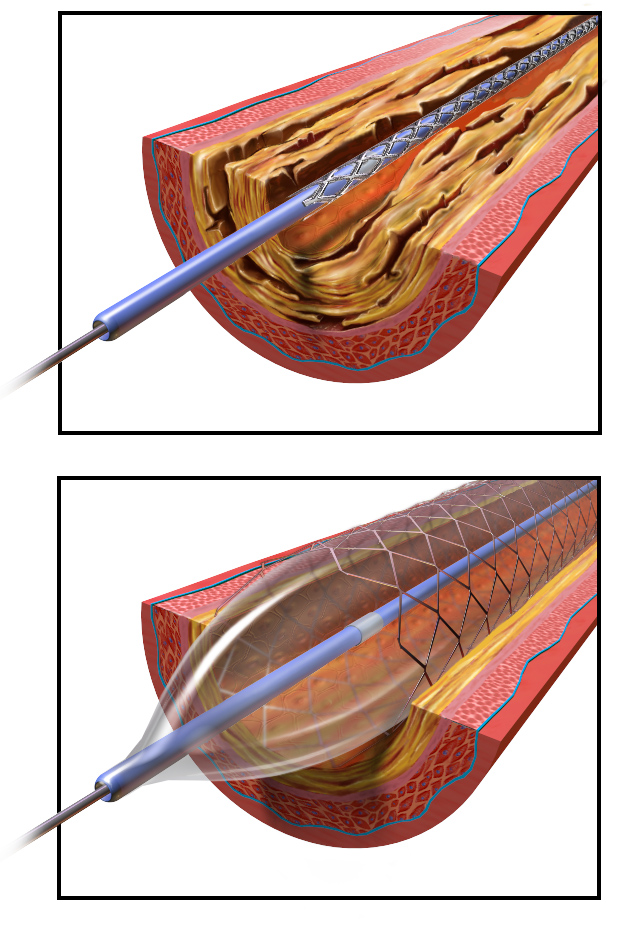

=== Stenting vs. medical therapy ===
Historically, balloon dilation of vascular lesions was first performed in 1964. The first treatment of renovascular lesions by percutaneous catheter angioplasty (PTA) was performed in 1978 by Andreas Roland Grüntzig. Stenting became the standard of endovascular care for ostial stenoses because of the poor technical success of PTA. The use of renal artery stents, particularly for ostial lesions, has further improved long-term patency rates. Further research into the efficacy of renal artery stenting has since been conducted, including the ASTRAL and CORAL trials, and research is ongoing as to whether there is a clear benefit to stenting over more conservative management, such as by medications alone.

The ASTRAL trial randomized 806 patients to renal artery revascularization via stenting versus medical therapy, with the following results:

- No survival advantage in the stented group
- No benefit for renal function in the stented group
- Serious complications with stenting (2 deaths, 3 amputations, others)

The CORAL study randomized 947 patients to stenting versus medical therapy, with a primary endpoint of major cardiovascular or renal events. Similarly, this study also found there was no benefit to stenting over medical treatment alone.

Collectively, the evidence so far does not support renal artery stenting as a proper mainstay treatment for stenosis because it conveys no survival benefit, no true renoprotection, and does not decrease the need for antihypertensive medications. A debate remains about whether or not it is beneficial to stent for purely ostial lesions, and comparing the success in treating with angioplasty (such as balloon dilatation) versus stenting. Smoking cessation and thoughtful blood pressure control, via lifestyle/dietary changes and medication, are the current mainstays of managing renovascular hypertension.

=== Fibromuscular dysplasia ===
Angioplasty alone is preferred in fibromuscular dysplasia, with stenting reserved for unsuccessful angioplasty or complications such as dissection.

== Prognosis ==
Patients with total occlusion or high-grade stenoses (e.g., >95%) of one or more renal arteries have an approximately 50% four-year survival rate. The more acute causes of death are usually related to cardiovascular disease, including heart attacks, stroke, and heart failure, often driven by severe and resistant hypertension. Over the long term, death may be caused by chronic renal failure, which is associated with fluid overload, electrolyte abnormalities, and the accumulation of urea, creatinine, and acidic compounds in the blood (uremia).

== Epidemiology ==
Renal artery stenosis (RAS) is a common cause of secondary hypertension (HTN), affecting <1% of patients with mild HTN but up to 10%–40% of those with severe or refractory HTN. As stated previously, RAS is predominantly caused by atherosclerosis, which is more common in older patients. In younger patients, especially women, fibromuscular dysplasia (FMD) can be attributed to a 75%–80% incidence of RAS. RAS is found in roughly 7% of elderly patients and is responsible for 5–22% of chronic kidney disease (CKD) in patients older than 50. Prevalence is higher in patients with other vascular diseases, including those with peripheral vascular disease and/or those requiring coronary catheterization.
