= Interlobar arteries =

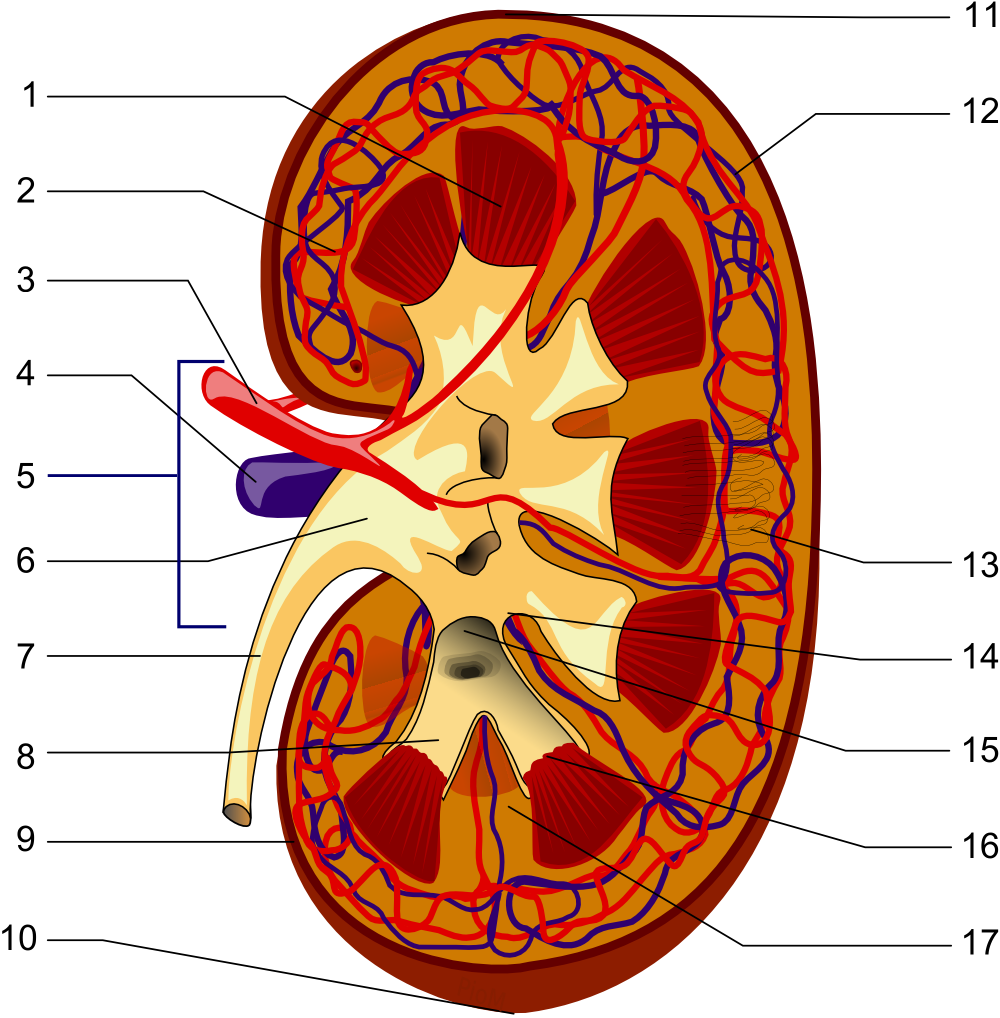
- 1. Renal pyramid 2. Interlobular artery 3. Renal artery 4. Renal vein 5. Renal hilum 6. Renal pelvis 7. Ureter; 8. Minor calyx 9. Renal capsule 10. Inferior renal capsule 11. Superior renal capsule 12. Interlobar vein 13. Nephron; 14. Renal sinus 15. Major calyx 16. Renal papilla 17. Renal column

Details
- Source: renal artery, via segmental arteries and lobar arteries
- Branches: arcuate arteries
- Vein: Interlobar veins

Identifiers
- Latin: arteriae interlobares renis
- TA98: A08.1.03.002
- TA2: 4281
- FMA: 70496

The interlobar arteries are vessels of the renal circulation which supply the renal lobes. The interlobar arteries branch from the lobar arteries which branch from the segmental arteries, from the renal artery. They give rise to arcuate arteries.
