= Cortex (anatomy) =

Outermost layer of an organ

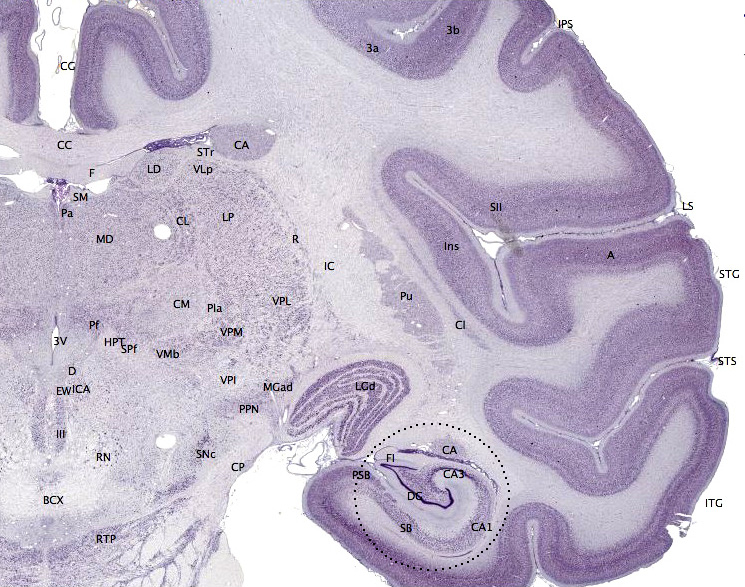
The cerebral cortex, in this case of a rhesus macaque monkey, is the outer layer depicted in dark violet.

In anatomy and zoology, the cortex (pl.: cortices) is the outermost, otherwise known as superficial, layer of an organ. Organs with well-defined cortical layers include kidneys, adrenal glands, ovaries, the thymus, and the brain, including the cerebellar cortex and the cerebral cortex, the best-known of all cortices.

== Etymology ==
The word is of Latin origin and means bark, rind, shell or husk.

== Notable examples ==
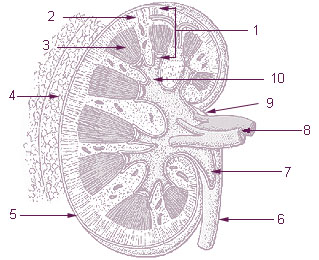
The renal cortex, here denoted by the number 2.

- The renal cortex, between the renal capsule and the renal medulla; assists in ultrafiltration.
- The adrenal cortex, situated along the perimeter of the adrenal gland; mediates the stress response through the production of various hormones.
- The thymic cortex, mainly composed of lymphocytes; functions as a site for somatic recombination of T cell receptors, and positive selection.
- The cerebral cortex, the outer layer of the cerebrum, plays a key role in memory, attention, perceptual awareness, thought, language, and consciousness.
- Cortical bone is the hard outer layer of bone; distinct from the spongy, inner cancellous bone tissue.
- Ovarian cortex is the outer layer of the ovary and contains the follicles.
- The lymph node cortex is the outer layer of the lymph node.

== Cerebral cortex ==
The cerebral cortex is typically described as comprising three parts: the sensory, motor, and association areas. These sensory areas receive and process information from the senses. The senses of vision, audition, and touch are served by the primary visual cortex, the primary auditory cortex, and primary somatosensory cortex. The cerebellar cortex is the thin gray surface layer of the cerebellum, consisting of an outer molecular layer or stratum moleculare, a single layer of Purkinje cells (the ganglionic layer), and an inner granular layer or stratum granulosum. The cortex is the outer surface of the cerebrum and is composed of gray matter.

The motor areas are located in both hemispheres of the cerebral cortex. Two areas of the cortex are commonly referred to as motor: the primary motor cortex, which executes voluntary movements; and the supplementary motor areas and premotor cortex, which select voluntary movements. In addition, motor functions have been attributed to the posterior parietal cortex, which guides voluntary movements; and the dorsolateral prefrontal cortex, which decides which voluntary movements to make according to higher-order instructions, rules, and self-generated thoughts.

The association areas of the cerebral cortex organize information received from the sensory and motor areas. The association areas of the human brain are highly developed, and are thought to play an integral role in complex functions. The association areas can be divided into 3 categories: the parasensory association cortex, the frontal association cortex, and the paralimbic association cortex. The parasensory association cortex receives signals from the primary sensory areas. The paralimbic association cortex connects with the organs of the limbic system. The frontal association cortex can be split into the premotor cortex and the prefrontal cortex. The premotor cortex is sent signals from the primary motor cortex, and the prefrontal cortex is sent signals from the premotor cortex.
