= Arteriola glomerularis =

Arteriola glomerularis may refer to:

- Afferent arterioles, also known as arteriola glomerularis afferens
- Efferent arteriole, also known as arteriola glomerularis efferens
