= Stellate veins =

Details
- Drains from: Interlobular arteries
- Drains to: Interlobular veins

Identifiers
- Latin: Venae stellatae renis
- TA98: A08.1.04.006
- FMA: 71635

The stellate veins are minute veins situated just beneath the fibrous capsule of the kidney. The stellate veins drain the superficial-most portion of the renal cortex. Groups of 5 or 6 stellate veins are arranged in a star-like pattern, converging centrally to drain into an interlobular vein as it penetrates into the renal cortex.

== See also ==
- renal circulation
