= Stellate =

Stellate, meaning star-shaped, may be used to describe:

== Biology ==
- Stellate cell (disambiguation)
- Stellate ganglion
- Stellate reticulum
- Stellate veins
- Stellate trichomes (hairs)

== Other ==
- Stellate wounds from lacerations or incisions
- Stellation, a geometric process of extending a polygon or polyhedron
