= Capsula fibrosa =

Capsula fibrosa may refer to:

- Fibrous capsule of Glisson
- Renal capsule
