= Tubuloglomerular feedback =

Negative feedback mechanism regulating the glomerular filtration rate

In the physiology of the kidney, tubuloglomerular feedback (TGF) is a feedback system inside the kidneys. Within each nephron, information from the renal tubules (a downstream area of the tubular fluid) is signaled to the glomerulus (an upstream area). Tubuloglomerular feedback is one of several mechanisms the kidney uses to regulate glomerular filtration rate (GFR). It involves the concept of purinergic signaling, in which an increased distal tubular sodium chloride concentration causes a basolateral release of adenosine from the macula densa cells. This initiates a cascade of events that ultimately brings GFR to an appropriate level.

== Background ==
The kidney maintains the electrolyte concentrations, osmolality, and acid-base balance of blood plasma within the narrow limits that are compatible with effective cellular function; and the kidney participates in blood pressure regulation and in the maintenance of steady whole-organism water volume.

Fluid flow through the nephron must be kept within a narrow range for normal renal function in order to not compromise the ability of the nephron to maintain salt and water balance. Tubuloglomerular feedback (TGF) regulates tubular flow by detecting and correcting changes in GFR. Active transepithelial transport is used by the thick ascending limb of loop of Henle (TAL) cells to pump NaCl to the surrounding interstitium from luminal fluid. The tubular fluid is diluted because the cell's walls are water-impermeable and do not lose water as NaCl is actively reabsorbed. Thus, the TAL is an important segment of the TGF system, and its transport properties allow it to act as a key operator of the TGF system. A reduction of GFR occurs as a result of TGF when NaCl concentration at the sensor site is increased within the physiological range of approximately 10 to 60 mM.

The TGF mechanism is a negative feedback loop in which the chloride ion concentration is sensed downstream in the nephron by the macula densa (MD) cells in the tubular wall near the end of TAL and the glomerulus. The muscle tension in the afferent arteriole is modified based on the difference between the sensed concentration and a target concentration. Vasodilation of the afferent arteriole, which results in increased glomerular filtration pressure and tubular fluid flow, occurs when MD cells detect a chloride concentration that is below a target value. A higher fluid flow rate in the TAL allows less time for dilution of the tubular fluid so that MD chloride concentration increases. Glomerular flow is decreased if the chloride concentration is above the target value. Constricting the smooth muscle cells in the afferent arteriole, results in a reduced concentration of chloride at the MD. TGF stabilizes the fluid and solute delivery into the distal portion of the loop of Henle and maintain the rate of filtration near its ideal value using these mechanisms.

== Mechanism ==
The macula densa is a collection of densely packed epithelial cells at the junction of the thick ascending limb (TAL) and distal convoluted tubule (DCT). As the TAL ascends through the renal cortex, it encounters its own glomerulus, bringing the macula densa to rest at the angle between the afferent and efferent arterioles. The macula densa's position enables it to rapidly alter afferent arteriolar resistance in response to changes in the flow rate through the distal nephron.

The macula densa uses the composition of the tubular fluid as an indicator of GFR. A large sodium chloride concentration is indicative of an elevated GFR, while low sodium chloride concentration indicates a depressed GFR. Sodium chloride is sensed by the macula densa mainly by an apical Na-K-2Cl cotransporter (NKCC2). The relationship between the TGF and NKCC2 can be seen through the administration of loop diuretics like furosemide. Furosemide blocks NaCl reabsorption mediated by the NKCC2 at the ascending loop of Henle, which leads to increased renin release. Excluding loop diuretic use, the usual situation that causes a reduction in reabsorption of NaCl via the NKCC2 at the macula densa (DCT) is a low tubular lumen concentration of NaCl due to low GFR. Reduced NaCl uptake via the NKCC2 at the macula densa leads to increased renin release, which leads to restoration of plasma volume, and to dilation of the afferent arterioles, which leads to increased renal plasma flow and increased GFR.

The macula densa's detection of elevated sodium chloride concentration in the tubular lumen, which leads to a decrease in GFR, is based on the concept of purinergic signaling.

In response to increased flow of tubular fluid in the thick ascending limb/ increased sodium chloride (salt) concentration at the macula densa:

1. Elevated filtration at the glomerulus or reduced reabsorption of sodium and water by the proximal convoluted tubule causes the tubular fluid at the macula densa to have a higher concentration of sodium chloride.
2. Apical Na-K-2Cl cotransporters (NKCC2), which are found on the surface of the macula densa cells, are exposed to the fluid with a higher sodium concentration, and as a result more sodium is transported into the cells.
3. The macula densa cells do not have enough Na/K ATPases on their basolateral surface to excrete this added sodium. This results in an increase of the cell's osmolarity.
4. Water flows into the cell along the osmotic gradient, causing the cell to swell. When the cell swells, ATP escapes through a basolateral, stretch-activated, non-selective Maxi-Anion channel. The ATP is subsequently converted to adenosine by ecto-5′-nucleotidase.
5. Adenosine constricts the afferent arteriole by binding with high affinity to the A_{1} receptors a G_{i}/G_{o}. Adenosine binds with much lower affinity to A_{2A} and A_{2B} receptors causing dilation of efferent arterioles.
6. The binding of adenosine to the A_{1} receptor causes a complex signal cascade involving the G_{i} subunit deactivating Ac, thus reducing cAMP and the G_{o} subunit activating PLC, IP3 and DAG. The IP3 causes the release of intracellular calcium, which spreads to neighbouring cells via gap junctions creating a "TGF calcium wave". This causes afferent arteriolar vasoconstriction, decreasing the glomerular filtrate rate.
7. The G_{i} and increased intracellular calcium, cause a decrease in cAMP which inhibits Renin release from the juxtaglomerular cells. In addition, when macula densa cells detect higher concentrations of Na and Cl, they inhibit nitric oxide synthetase (decreasing renin release), but the most important inhibitory mechanism of renin synthesis and release is elevations in juxtaglomerular cell calcium concentration.

In response to decreased flow of tubular fluid in the thick ascending limb / decreased salt concentration at the macula densa:

1. Reduced filtration at the glomerulus or increased reabsorption of sodium and water by the proximal convoluted tubule causes fluid in the tubule at the macula densa to have a reduced concentration of sodium chloride.
2. NKCC2 has a lower activity and subsequently causes a complicated signaling cascade involving the activation of: p38, (ERK½), (MAP) kinases, (COX-2) and microsomal prostaglandin E synthase (mPGES) in the macula densa.
3. This causes the synthesis and release of PGE2.
4. PGE2 acts on EP2 and EP4 receptors in juxtaglomerular cells and causes renin release.
5. Renin release activates RAAS leading to many outcomes including an increased GFR.

The critical target of the trans-JGA signaling cascade is the glomerular afferent arteriole; its response consists of an increase in net vasoconstrictor tone resulting in reductions of glomerular capillary pressure (PGC) and glomerular plasma flow. Efferent arterioles appear to play a lesser role; experimental evidence supports both vasoconstriction and vasodilation, with perhaps the former in the lower range and the latter in the higher range of NaCl concentrations (2). When feedback regulation of afferent arteriolar tone is prevented by interrupting the feedback loop, and when the sensing mechanism is fully activated by saturating NaCl concentrations, TGF reduces GFR on average by approximately 45% and PGC by approximately 20%. Afferent arteriolar resistance increases by 50% or less, consistent with a radius reduction of approximately 10%, if Poiseuille's law holds. Thus, TGF-induced vasoconstriction is usually limited in magnitude.

== Modulation ==
A mediating agent is released or generated as a function of changes in luminal NaCl concentration. The size of the TGF response is directly dependent upon these changes. "In part because of the striking effect of deletion of A1 adenosine receptors (A1AR), adenosine generated from released ATP has been proposed as the critical TGF mediator. A modulating agent affects the TGF response without input regarding luminal NaCl. The agents are vasoactive substances that alter either the magnitude or the sensitivity of the TGF response.

Factors that decrease TGF sensitivity include:

- atrial natriuretic peptide
- nitric oxide
  - The oxidative stress in the macula dense is determined by interactions between nitric oxide (NO) and superoxide (O ). TGF response is normally controlled by the NO generated in the macula densa.
- cAMP
- PGI_{2}
- high-protein diet

The threshold at which the loop of Henle flow rate initiates feedback responses is affected. A high protein diet affects the feedback activity by making the single nephron glomerular filtration rate higher, and the Na and Cl concentrations in early distal tubule fluid lower. The signal eliciting the TG feedback response is affected. The increased load on the kidney of high-protein diet is a result of an increase in reabsorption of NaCl.

- Connecting tubule glomerular feedback (CTGF): CTGF is initiated by increased sodium concentration at the connecting tubule segment of the nephron and involves the activation of epithelial sodium channel (ENaC). CTGF has the ability to modulate TGF mechanism and is critical in understanding renal damage observed in salt sensitive hypertension and kidney donors.

Factors that increase TGF sensitivity include:

- adenosine
- thromboxane
- 5-HETE
- angiotensin II
- prostaglandin E2
- aldosterone
  - Aldosterone within the connecting tubule lumen enhances connecting tubule glomerular feedback (CTGF) via a nongenomic effect involving GPR30 receptors and sodium/hydrogen exchanger (NHE). Aldosterone inside the connecting tubule lumen enhances CTGF via a cAMP/PKA/PKC pathway and stimulates O2− generation and this process may contribute to renal damage by increasing glomerular capillary pressure.

== See also ==
- Juxtaglomerular Apparatus
- Kidney
- Myogenic Mechanism
- Renal corpuscle
- Transforming growth factor
