= Autoregulation =

Adjustment within a biological system

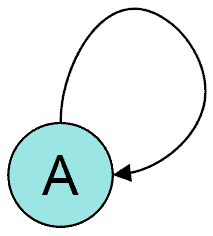
General scheme of the autoregulation

Autoregulation is a process within many biological systems, resulting from an internal adaptive mechanism that works to adjust (or mitigate) that system's response to stimuli. While most systems of the body show some degree of autoregulation, it is most clearly observed in the kidney, the heart, and the brain. Perfusion of these organs is essential for life, and through autoregulation the body can divert blood (and thus, oxygen) where it is most needed.

== Cerebral autoregulation ==
More so than most other organs, the brain is very sensitive to increased or decreased blood flow, and several mechanisms (metabolic, myogenic, and neurogenic) are involved in maintaining an appropriate cerebral blood pressure. Brain blood flow autoregulation is abolished in several disease states such as traumatic brain injury, stroke, brain tumors, or persistent abnormally high CO_{2} levels.

== Homeometrics and heterometric autoregulation of the heart ==
Homeometric autoregulation, in the context of the circulatory system, is the heart's ability to increase contractility and restore stroke volume when afterload increases. Homeometric autoregulation occurs independently of cardiomyocyte fiber length, via the Bowditch and/or Anrep effects.

- Via the Bowditch effect, positive inotropy occurs secondary to an increased cardiac frequency. The exact mechanism for this remains unknown, but it appears to be the result of an increased exposure of the heart to contractile substances arising from the increased flow caused by an increased cardiac frequency.
- Via the Anrep effect, a biphasic increase in contractility and prolongation of systole occur in response to acute rises in afterload, driven by an initial myofilament strain-sensitive recruitment of myosin heads, followed by post-translational modifications of contractile proteins.

This is in contrast to heterometric regulation, governed by the Frank-Starling law, where increased ventricular filling stretches sarcomeres, optimizing actin-myosin filament overlap to enhance cross-bridge formation. This process, known as 'myofilament length-dependent activation', includes structural changes in myosin, involving a transition from rested to contraction-ready states. This shift increases the number of myosin heads available for actin binding, amplifying myocardial force production. Additional mechanisms, such as increased calcium sensitivity of myofilaments, further enhance contractile strength and stroke volume.

== Coronary circulatory autoregulation ==
Since the heart is a very aerobic organ, needing oxygen for the efficient production of ATP & Creatine Phosphate from fatty acids (and to a smaller extent, glucose & very little lactate), the coronary circulation is auto regulated so that the heart receives the right flow of blood & hence sufficient supply of oxygen. If a sufficient flow of oxygen is met and the resistance in the coronary circulation rises (perhaps due to vasoconstriction), then the coronary perfusion pressure (CPP) increases proportionally, to maintain the same flow. In this way, the same flow through the coronary circulation is maintained over a range of pressures. This part of coronary circulatory regulation is known as auto regulation and it occurs over a plateau, reflecting the constant blood flow at varying CPP & resistance. The slope of a CBF (coronary blood flow) vs. CPP graph gives 1/Resistance. Autoregulation maintains a normal blood flow within the pressure range of 70–110 mm Hg. Blood flow is independent of bp. However autoregulation of blood flow in the heart is not so well developed like that in brain.

== Renal autoregulation ==
Regulation of renal blood flow is important to maintaining a stable glomerular filtration rate (GFR) despite changes in systemic blood pressure (within about 80-180 mmHg). In a mechanism called tubuloglomerular feedback, the kidney changes its own blood flow in response to changes in sodium concentration. The sodium chloride levels in the urinary filtrate are sensed by the macula densa cells at the end of the ascending limb. When sodium levels are moderately increased, the macula densa releases ATP and reduces prostaglandin E2 release to the juxtaglomerular cells nearby. The juxtaglomerular cells in the afferent arteriole constrict, and juxtaglomerular cells in both the afferent and efferent arteriole decrease their renin secretion. These actions function to lower GFR. Further increase in sodium concentration leads to the release of nitric oxide, a vasodilating substance, to prevent excessive vasoconstriction. In the opposite case, juxtaglomerular cells are stimulated to release more renin, which stimulates the renin–angiotensin system, producing angiotensin I which is converted by Angio-Tensin Converting Enzyme (ACE) to angiotensin II. Angiotensin II then causes preferential constriction of the efferent arteriole of the glomerulus and increases the GFR.

== Autoregulation of genes ==
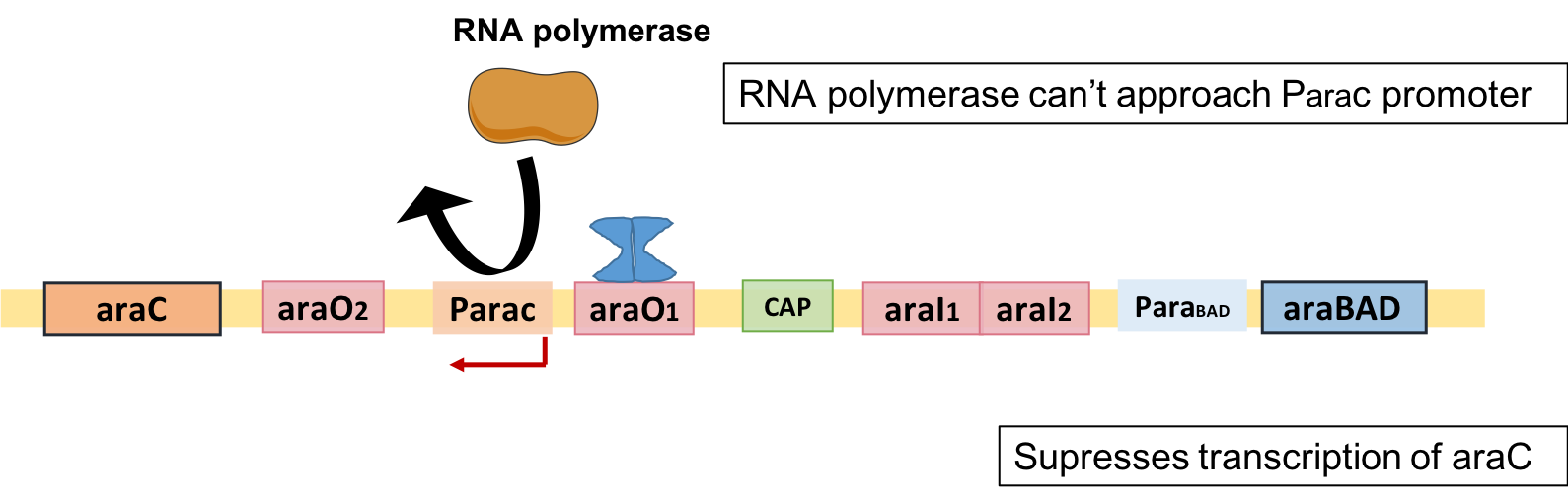
Autoregulation of the araC gene expression

This is so-called "steady-state system". An example is a system in which a protein P that is a product of gene G "positively regulates its own production by binding to a regulatory element of the gene coding for it," and the protein gets used or lost at a rate that increases as its concentration increases. This feedback loop creates two possible states "on" and "off". If an outside factor makes the concentration of P increase to some threshold level, the production of protein P is "on", i.e. P will maintain its own concentration at a certain level, until some other stimulus will lower it down below the threshold level, when concentration of P will be insufficient to make gene G express at the rate that would overcome the loss or use of the protein P. This state ("on" or "off") gets inherited after cell division, since the concentration of protein a usually remains the same after mitosis. However, the state can be easily disrupted by outside factors.

Similarly, this phenomenon is not only restricted to genes but may also apply to other genetic units, including mRNA transcripts. Regulatory segments of mRNA called a Riboswitch can autoregulate its transcription by sequestering cis-regulatory elements (particularly the Shine-Dalgarno sequence) located on the same transcript as the Riboswitch. The Riboswitch stem-loop has a region complementary to the Shine-Dalgarno but is sequestered by complementary base pairing in the loop. With sufficient ligand, the ligand may bind to the stem-loop and disrupt intermolecular bonding, resulting in the complementary Shine-Dalgarno stem-loop segment binding to the complementary Riboswitch segment, preventing Ribosome from binding, inhibiting translation.

== See also ==
- Homeostasis
- Renin–angiotensin system
