= Medulla (lichenology) =

Horizontal layer within a lichen thallus

The medulla is a horizontal layer within a lichen thallus. It is a loosely arranged layer of interlaced hyphae below the upper cortex and photobiont zone, but above the lower cortex. The medulla generally has a cottony appearance. It is the widest layer of a heteromerous lichen thallus.
