= Interlobular veins =

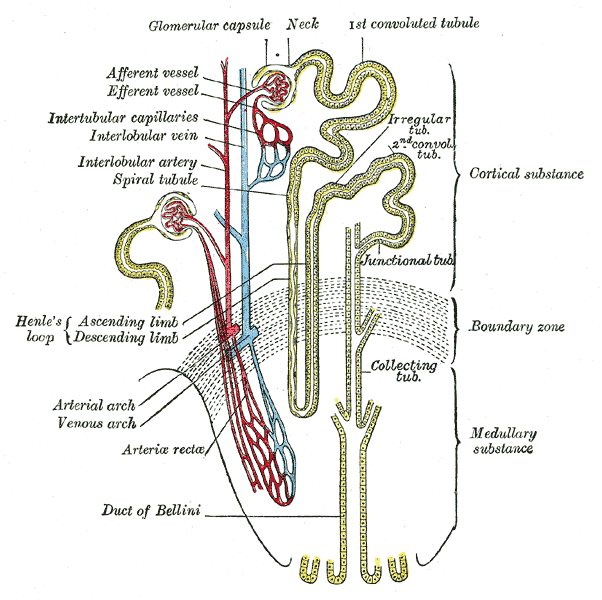
- Scheme of renal tubule and its vascular supply.

Details
- Drains from: Efferent arteriole
- Drains to: Arcuate vein
- Artery: Interlobular arteries

Identifiers
- Latin: venae interlobulares renis
- TA98: A05.8.01.058
- TA2: 3063
- FMA: 71453

The stellate veins join to form the interlobular veins, which pass inward between the rays, receive branches from the plexuses around the convoluted tubules, and, having arrived at the bases of the renal pyramids, join with the venae rectae.
