= Renal hilum =

Central fissure of the kidney

Hilum of kidney
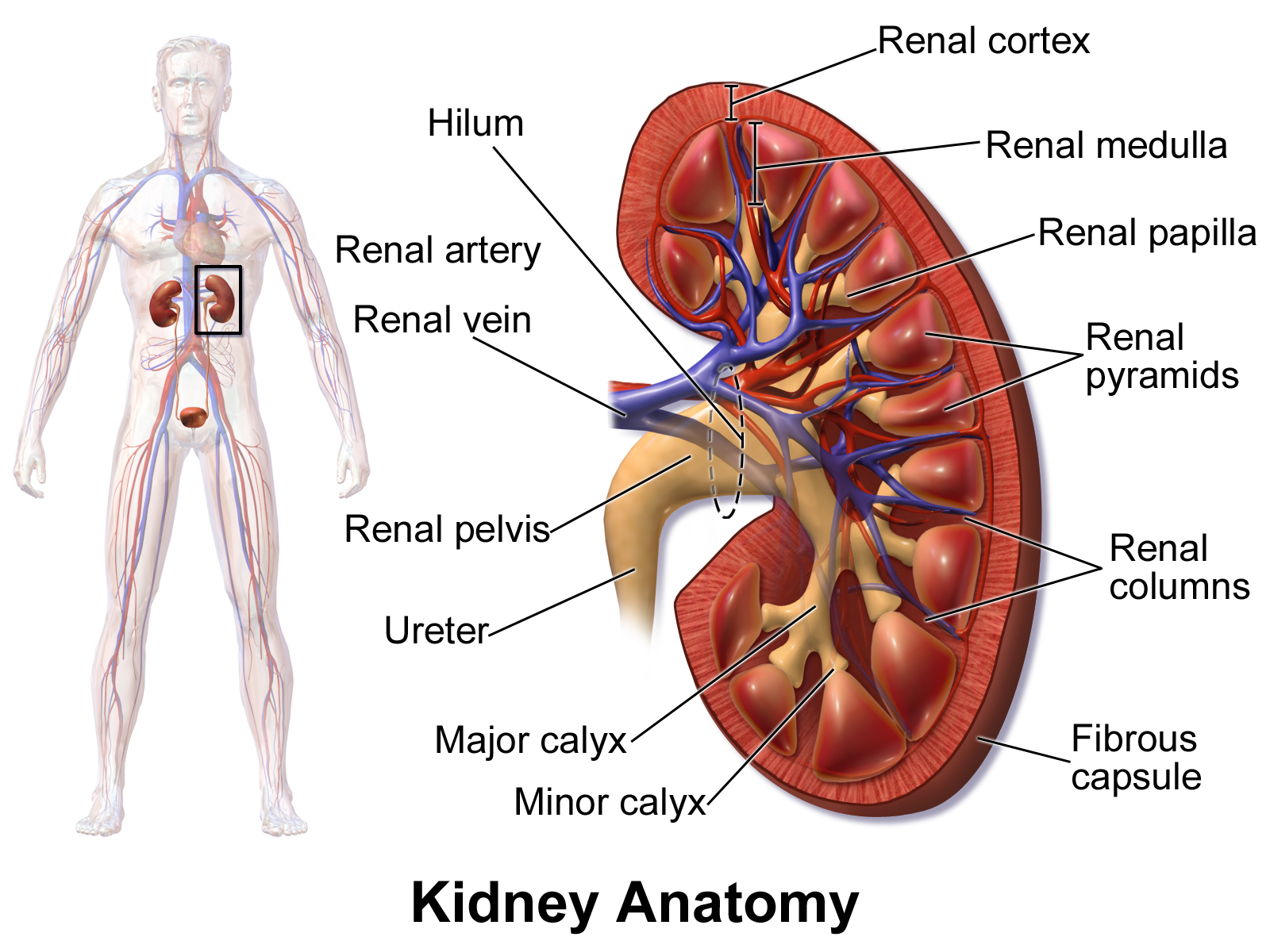
- Kidney anatomy, with hilum labeled at upper left.

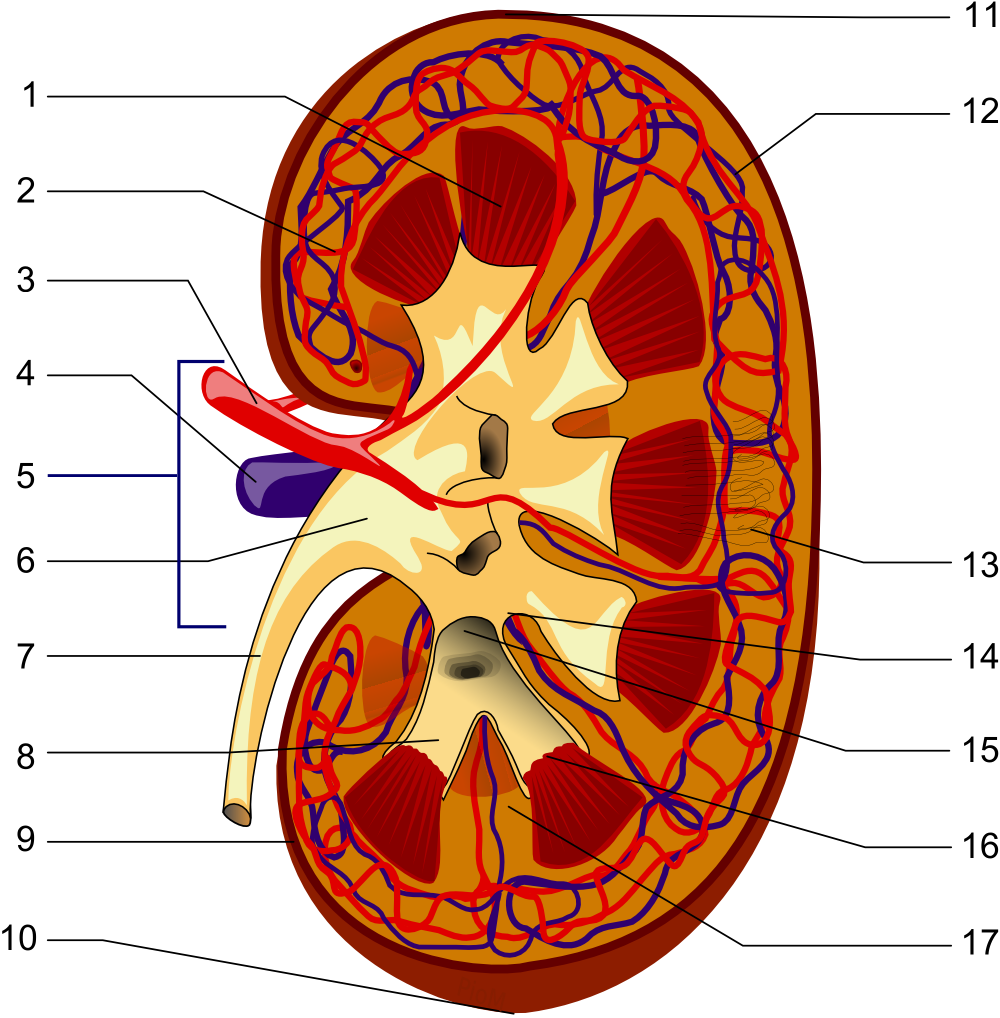
- 1. Renal pyramid; 2. Interlobular artery; 3. Renal artery; 4. Renal vein; 5. Renal hilum; 6. Renal pelvis; 7. Ureter; 8. Minor calyx; 9. Renal capsule; 10. Inferior renal capsule; 11. Superior renal capsule; 12. Interlobar vein; 13. Nephron; 14. Renal sinus; 15. Major calyx; 16. Renal papilla; 17. Renal column

Details

Identifiers
- Latin: hylus renale
- TA98: A08.1.01.004
- TA2: 3361
- FMA: 15610

The renal hilum is the recessed central fissure of the kidney where its vessels, nerves and ureter (renal pedicle) pass. The medial border of the kidney is concave in the center and convex toward either extremity; it is directed forward and a little downward. Its central part presents a deep longitudinal fissure, bounded by prominent overhanging anterior and posterior lips. This fissure is a hilum that transmits the vessels, nerves, and ureter. From anterior to posterior, the renal vein exits, the renal artery enters, and the renal pelvis exits the kidney.

The hilum of the left kidney is located at the L1 vertebral level, and the right kidney at level L1-2. The lower border of the kidneys is usually alongside L3.

== Structure ==
The superior, middle, and inferior vessels enter or leave the hilum of kidney: from anterior to posterior is renal vein, renal artery and renal pelvis, respectively.

== See also ==
- Renal artery
- Renal vein
- Renal pyramids
- Renal medulla
