= Kokko and Rector Model =

The Kokko and Rector model is a theory explaining the mechanism of generation of a gradient in the inner medulla of the kidney. Unlike earlier theories explaining the mechanism using counter current mechanism (as is the case in the outer medulla), the driving force for salt reabsorption is stated to be urea accumulation. It has been proved that counter current mechanism cannot be the case in the inner medulla, since there are no salt pumps, and the cell membrane is too permeable to salt.

== History ==
It has been proposed by Juha Kokko and Floyd Rector Jr. in 1972.
