= Ureteric bud =

Protrusion from the mesonephric duct

Details
- Carnegie stage: 13
- Days: 35
- Precursor: Wolffian duct
- Gives rise to: Part of kidney (calyx, collecting duct, renal pelvis, ureter)

Identifiers
- Latin: gemma ureterica; diverticulum metanephricum
- TE: bud_by_E5.6.3.1.0.0.2 E5.6.3.1.0.0.2

The ureteric bud, also known as the metanephric diverticulum, is a protrusion from the mesonephric duct during the development of the urinary and reproductive organs. It later develops into a conduit for urine drainage from the kidneys, which, in contrast, originate from the metanephric blastema.
