= Renal cortex =

Outer part of the kidney

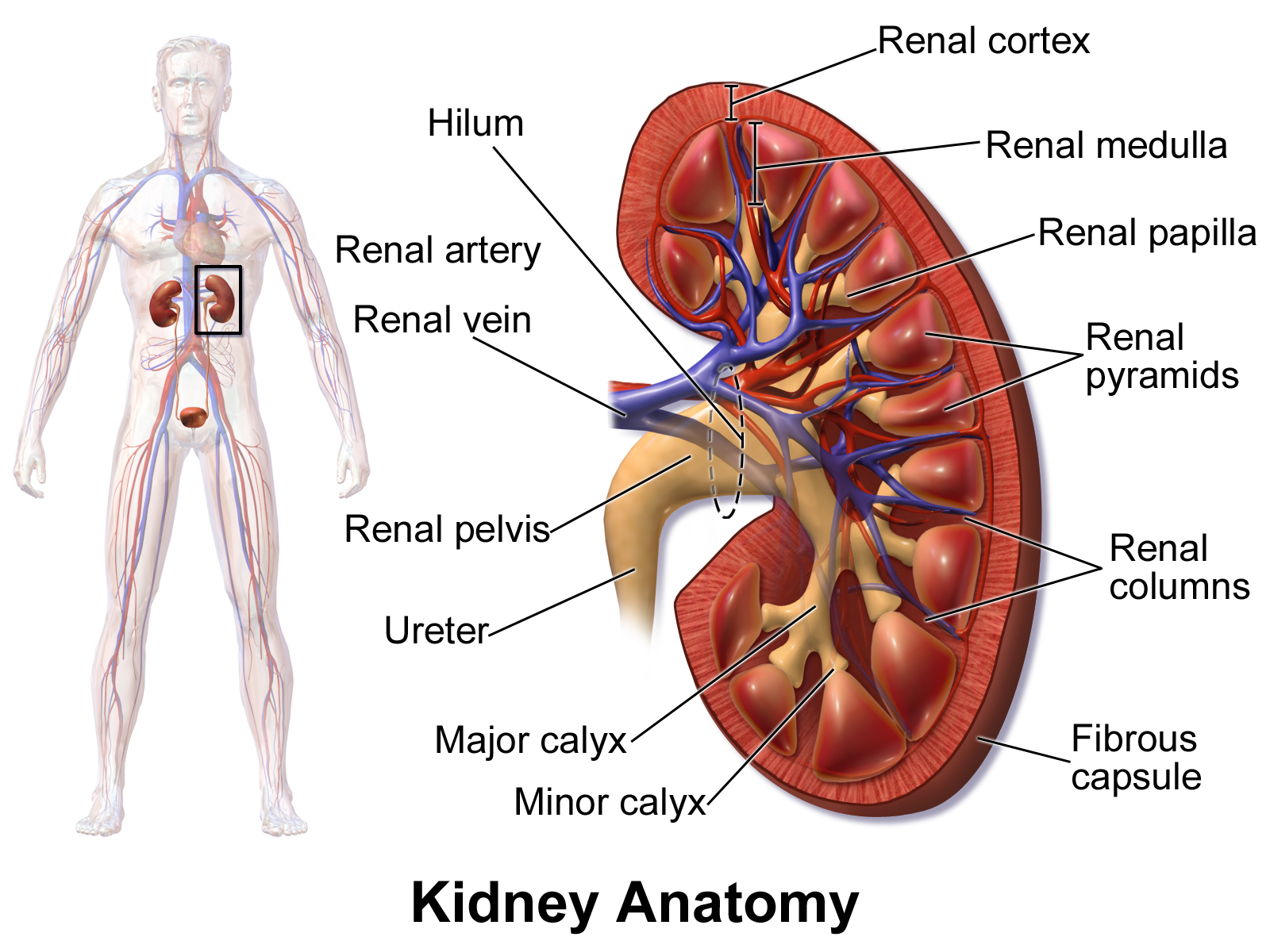
- Kidney anatomy, with renal cortex labeled at top.

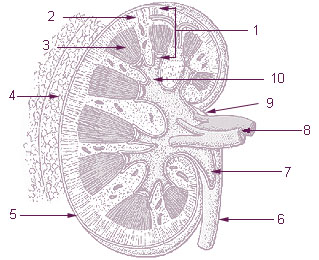
- 1: Parenchyma; 2: Cortex; 3: Medulla; 4: Perirenal fat; 5: Capsule; 6: Ureter; 7: Pelvis of kidney; 8: Renal artery and Renal vein; 9: Hilus; 10: Calyx

Details
- System: Urinary system

Identifiers
- Latin: cortex renalis
- MeSH: D007672
- TA98: A08.1.01.015
- TA2: 3368
- FMA: 15581

The renal cortex is the outer portion of the kidney between the renal capsule and the renal medulla. In the adult, it forms a continuous smooth outer zone with a number of projections (cortical columns) that extend down between the pyramids. It contains the renal corpuscles and the renal tubules except for parts of the loop of Henle which descend into the renal medulla. It also contains blood vessels and cortical collecting ducts.

The renal cortex is the part of the kidney where ultrafiltration occurs. Erythropoietin is produced in the renal cortex.

== Additional images ==
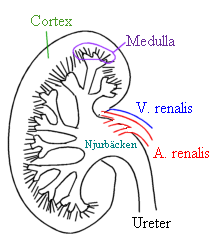
Kidney

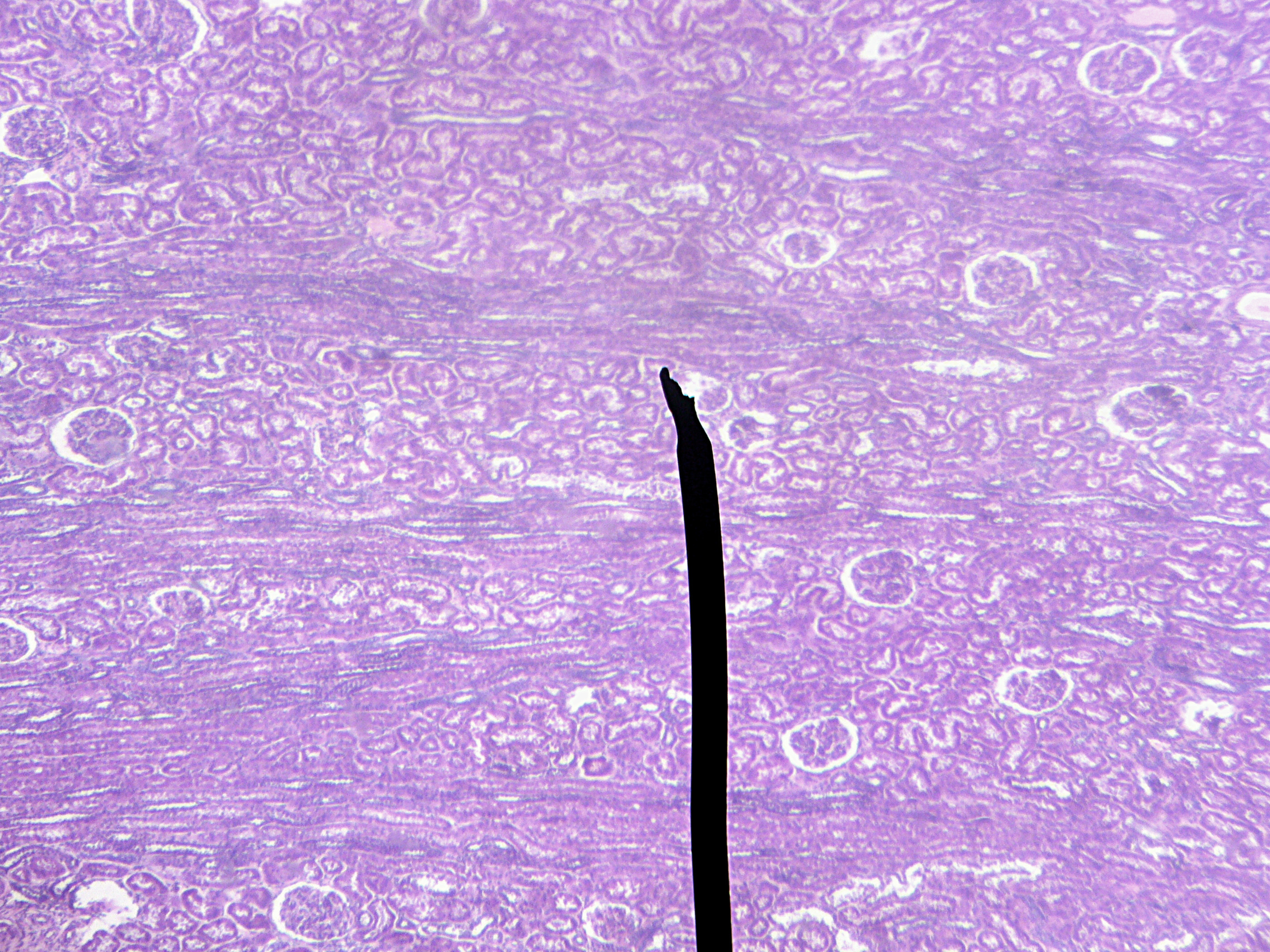
Microscopic cross section of the renal cortex

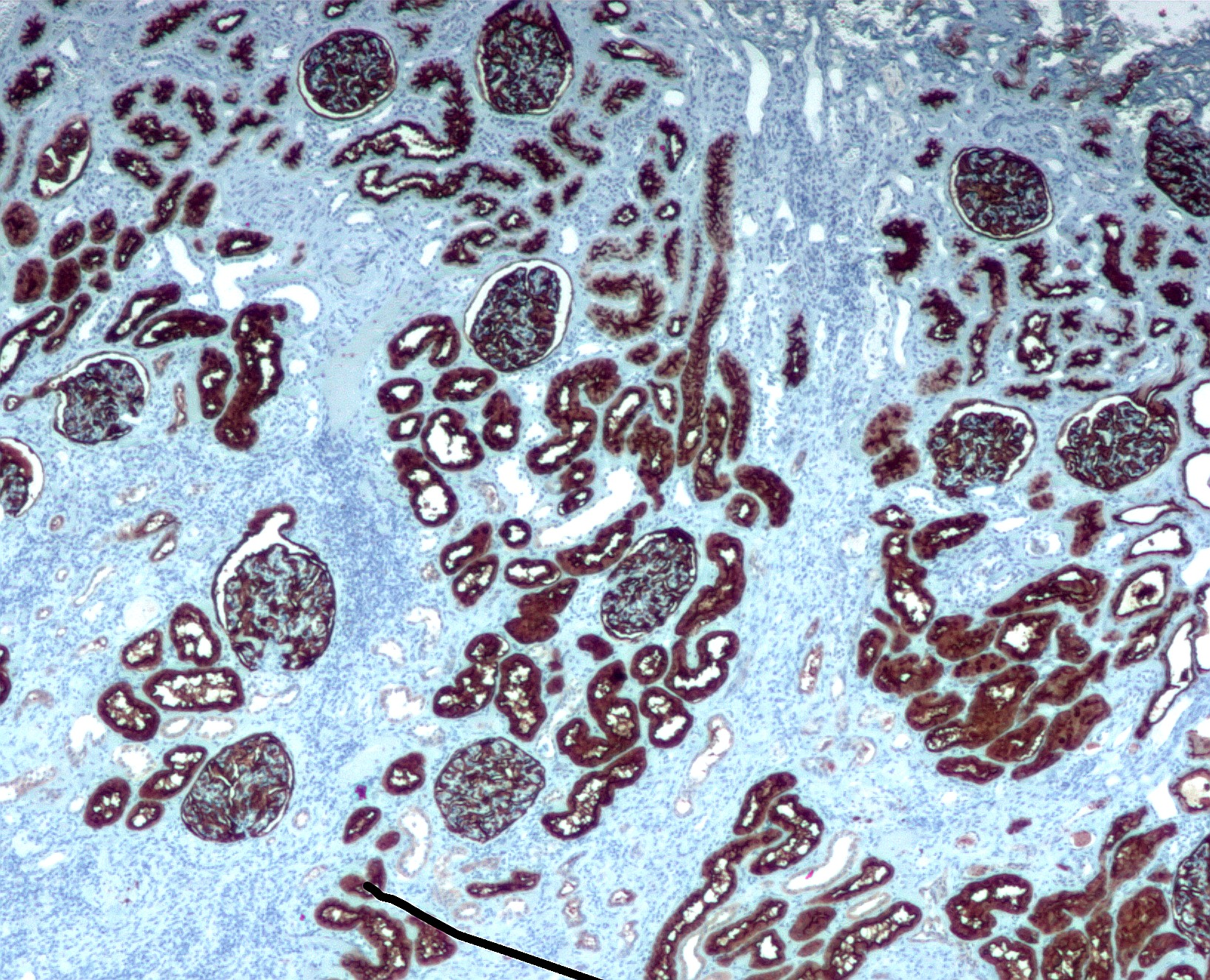
CD10 immunohistochemical staining of normal kidney. CD10 stains the proximal convoluted tubules and glomeruli.

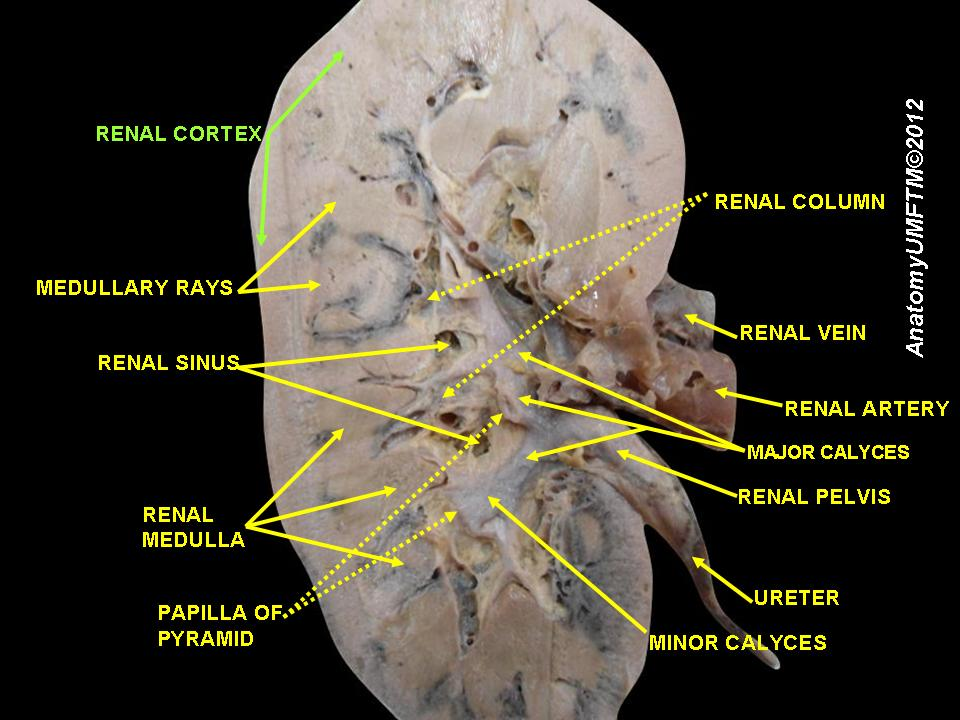
Renal cortex

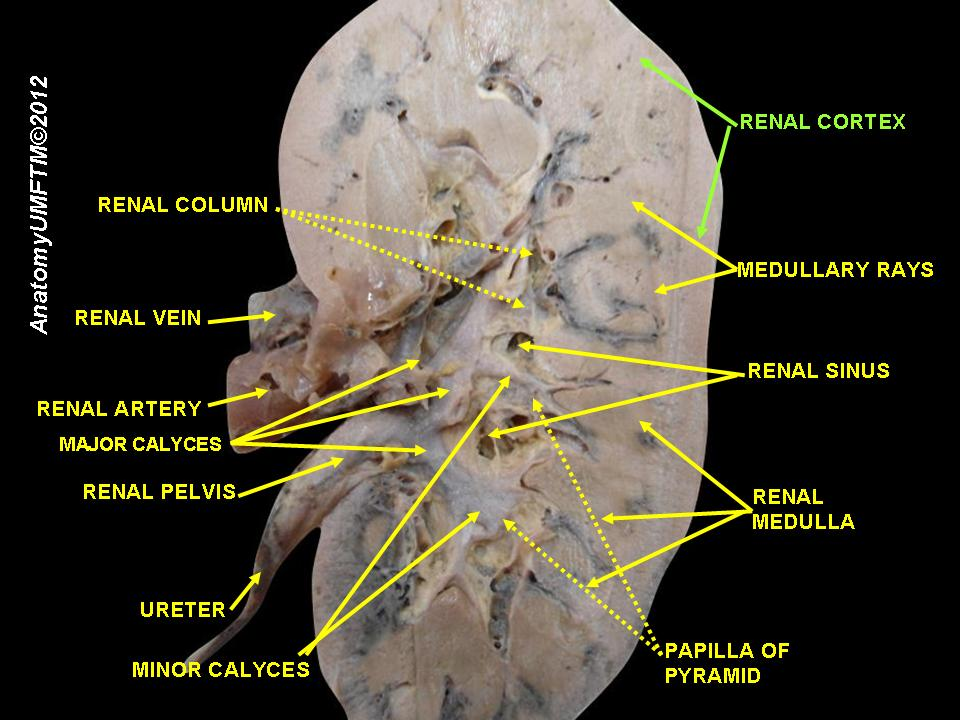
Renal cortex
