= Peritubular capillaries =

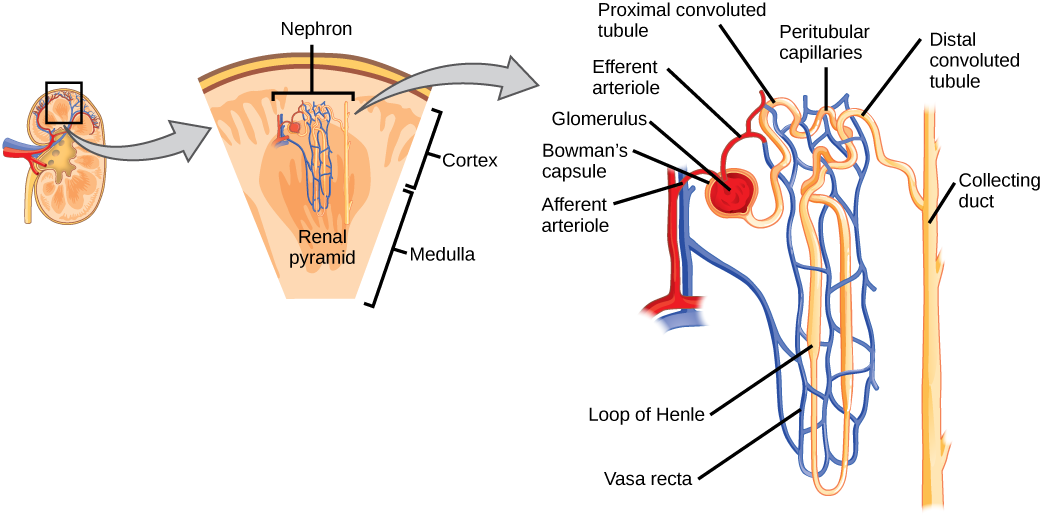

Details
- Source: Efferent arteriole
- Branches: Interlobular vein

In the renal system, peritubular capillaries are tiny blood vessels, supplied by the efferent arteriole, that travel alongside nephrons allowing reabsorption and secretion between blood and the inner lumen of the nephron. Peritubular capillaries surround the cortical parts of the proximal and distal tubules, while the vasa recta go into the medulla to approach the loop of Henle.

About one-fifth of the blood plasma is filtered into Bowman's capsule as the blood passes through the glomerular capillaries; four-fifths continues into the peritubular capillaries.

Ions and minerals that need to be saved in the body are reabsorbed into the peritubular capillaries through active transport, secondary active transport, or transcytosis.

The ions that need to be excreted as waste are secreted from the capillaries into the nephron to be sent towards the bladder and out of the body.

Essentially, the peritubular capillaries reabsorb useful substances such as glucose and amino acids and secrete certain mineral ions and excess water into the tubule.

The majority of exchange through the peritubular capillaries occurs because of chemical gradients osmosis and hydrostatic pressure. Movement of water into the peritubular capillaries is due to the loss of water from the glomerulus during filtration, which increases the colloid osmotic pressure of the blood. This blood leaves the glomerulus via the efferent arteriole, which supplies the peritubular capillaries. The higher osmolarity of the blood in the peritubular capillaries creates an osmotic pressure which causes the uptake of water. Other ions can be taken up by the peritubular capillaries via solvent drag. Water is also driven into the peritubular capillaries due to the higher fluid pressure of the interstitium, driven by reabsorption of fluid and electrolytes via active transport, and the low fluid pressure of blood entering the peritubular capillaries due to the narrowness of the efferent arteriole.
