= Stellate cell (disambiguation) =

Stellate cells or star shaped cells forms several places in the body.

- Stellate cells, found in layer I, II, and IV in cortical tissue
- Hepatic stellate cell, pericytes found in the perisinusoidal space of the liver.
- Pancreatic stellate cell, reside in exocrine areas of the pancreas
- Podocyte, found in the Bowman's capsule in the kidneys
- Osteocyte, commonly found cell in mature bone tissue
- Astrocyte
