= Vasa recta (kidney) =

Anatomical structure of the kidney

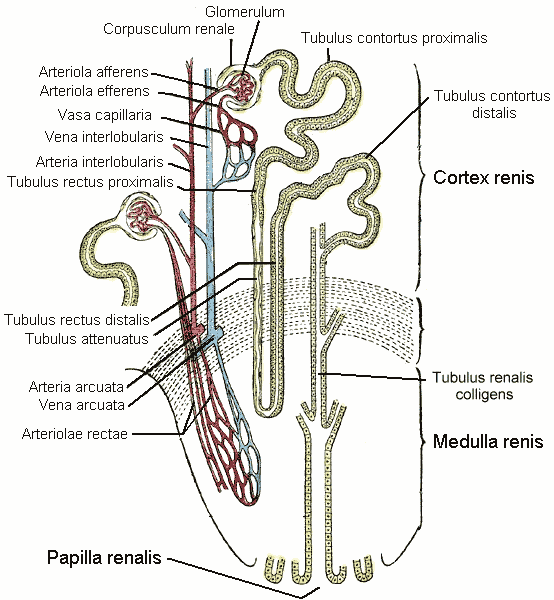
- A nephron, the vasa recta are labeled arteriolae rectae

Details
- System: Circulatory, Excretory
- Artery: efferent arteriole
- Vein: arcuate vein

Identifiers
- Latin: vasa recta renis
- TA98: A08.1.03.008
- FMA: 72006

The vasa recta of the kidney, (vasa recta renis) are capillaries of the kidney, – a series of blood vessels in the blood supply of the kidney that enter the medulla as the straight arterioles, and leave the medulla to ascend to the cortex as the straight venules. (Latin: vās, "vessel"; rēctus, "straight"). They lie parallel to the loop of Henle.

These vessels branch off the efferent arterioles of juxtamedullary nephrons (those nephrons closest to the medulla). They enter the medulla, and surround the loop of Henle. Whereas the peritubular capillaries surround the cortical parts of the tubules, the vasa recta go into the medulla and are closer to the loop of Henle, and leave to ascend to the cortex.

Terminations of the vasa recta form the straight venules, branches from the plexuses at the apices of the medullary pyramids. They run outward in a straight course between the tubes of the medullary substance and join the interlobular veins to form venous arcades. These in turn unite and form veins which pass along the sides of the renal pyramids. The descending vasa recta have a non-fenestrated endothelium that contains a facilitated transport for urea; the ascending vasa recta have, on the other hand, a fenestrated endothelium.

== Structure ==
=== Microanatomy ===
On a histological slide, the straight arterioles can be distinguished from the tubules of the loop of Henle by the presence of blood.

== Function ==
Each straight arteriole has a hairpin turn in the medulla and carries blood at a very slow rate – two factors crucial in the maintenance of countercurrent exchange that prevent washout of the concentration gradients established in the renal medulla.

The maintenance of this concentration gradient is one of the components responsible for the kidney's ability to produce concentrated urine.

On the descending portion of the vasa recta, sodium, chloride and urea are reabsorbed into the blood, while water is secreted. On the ascending portion, sodium chloride and urea are secreted into the interstitium, while water is reabsorbed.

== Clinical significance ==
The slow blood flow in the straight arterioles makes them a likely location of thrombosis from thrombophilia, or tissue loss due to red blood cell sickling in sickle cell disease. Ischemia that results may lead to renal papillary necrosis.

== Nomenclature ==
According to Terminologia Anatomica, the term "vasa recta renis" is an alternate name for "arteriolae rectae renis", and a separate term, venulae rectae renis, is used to identify the venous portion.

However, other sources consider "vasa recta" to refer to both the arterial and venous portions.

The term vasa recta is also used for the intestines – vasa recta (intestines) (in the ileum and jejunum)
