= Afferent arterioles =

Blood vessels supplying nephrons of kidneys

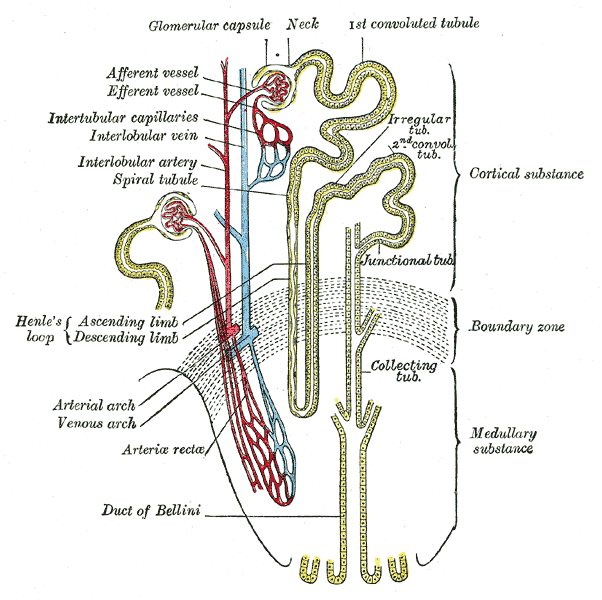
- Scheme of renal tubules and its vascular supply. (Label "Afferent vessel" is visible in upper left.)

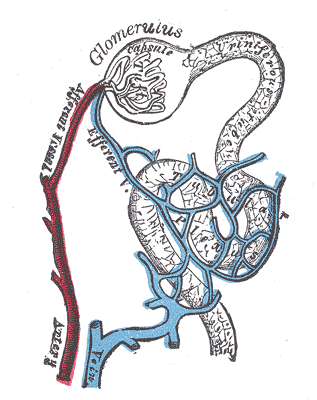
- Distribution of bloodvessels in cortex of kidney.

Details
- From: interlobular artery
- Supplies: glomerular capillaries

Identifiers
- Latin: arteriola glomerularis afferens
- TA98: A08.1.03.005
- FMA: 272216 77042, 272216

The afferent arterioles are a group of blood vessels that supply the nephrons in many excretory systems. They play an important role in the regulation of blood pressure as a part of the tubuloglomerular feedback mechanism.

The afferent arterioles branch from the renal artery, which supplies blood to the kidneys.

The afferent arterioles later diverge into the capillaries of the glomerulus.

== Regulation ==
When renal blood flow is reduced (indicating hypotension) or there is a decrease in sodium or chloride ion concentration, the macula densa of the distal tubule releases prostaglandins (mainly PGI2 and PGE2) and nitric oxide, which cause the juxtaglomerular cells lining the afferent arterioles to release renin, activating the renin–angiotensin–aldosterone system, to increase blood pressure and increase reabsorption of sodium ions into the bloodstream via aldosterone.

The macula densa cell can also increase the blood pressure of the afferent arterioles by decreasing the synthesis of adenosine or ATP.

If the efferent arterioles are constricted then the blood pressure in the capillaries of the kidneys will increase.

== See also ==
- Efferent arteriole
- Tubuloglomerular feedback
- Macula densa

== Additional images ==
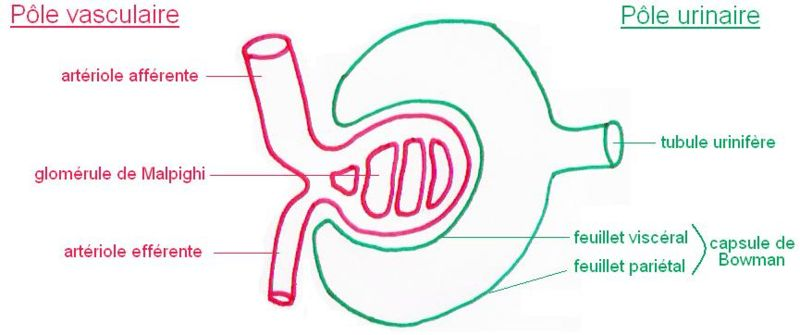
Malpighian corpuscle.

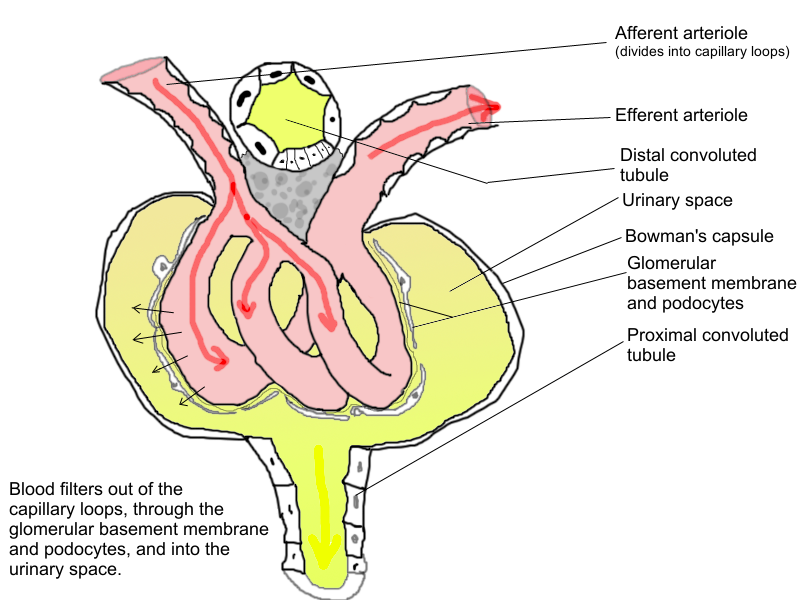
Glomerulus.

Renal corpuscle
