= Renal calyx =

Anatomical structure in the kidneys

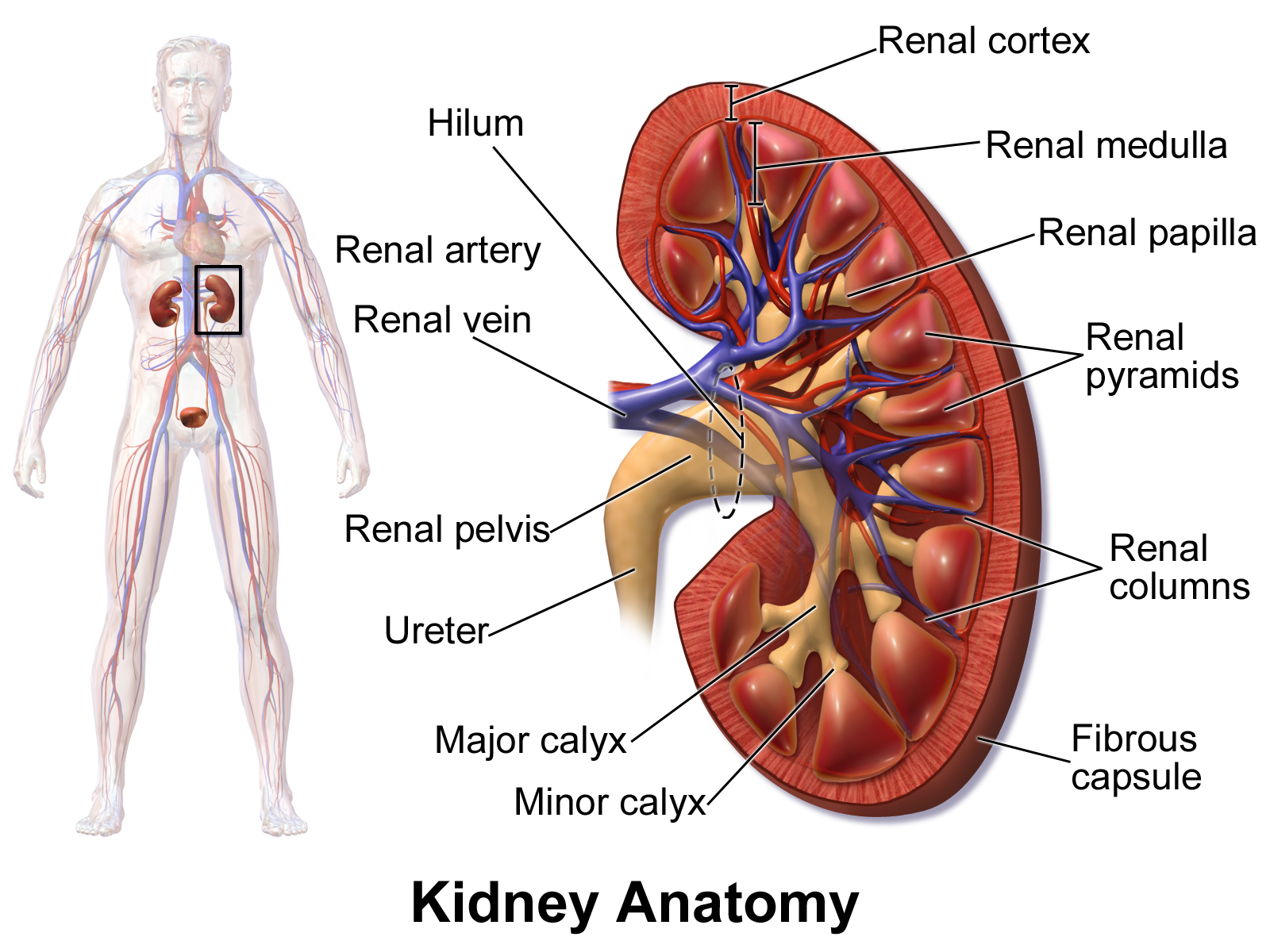
- Kidney, with major and minor calyces labeled near bottom.

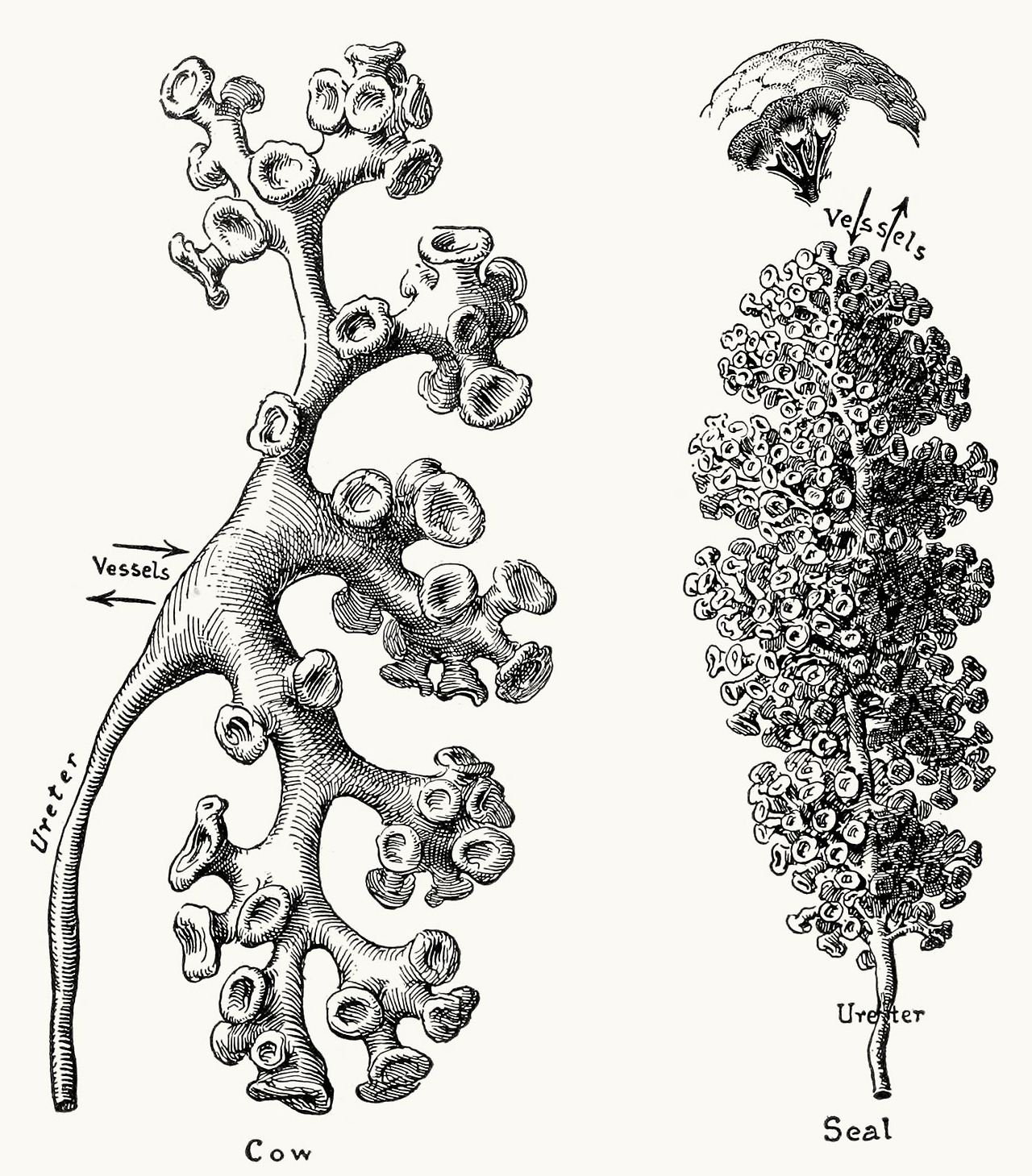
- An image showing just the pelvis and calices of the kidneys, with the rest of the kidney removed, from a dissected cow and seal specimen. These vary greatly in size and number depending on species.

Details
- Precursor: Ureteric bud
- System: Urinary system

Identifiers
- Latin: calices renales
- MeSH: D007670
- FMA: 284558

The renal calyces (sing. calyx) are conduits in the kidney through which urine passes. The minor calyces form a cup-shaped drain around the apex of the renal pyramids. Urine formed in the kidney passes through a renal papilla at the apex into the minor calyx; four or five minor calyces converge to form a major calyx through which urine passes into the renal pelvis (which in turn drains urine out of the kidney through the ureter).

== Function ==
Peristalsis of the smooth muscle originating in pace-maker cells originating in the walls of the calyces propels urine through the renal pelvis and ureters to the bladder. The initiation is caused by the increase in volume that stretches the walls of the calyces. This causes them to fire impulses which stimulate rhythmical contraction and relaxation, called peristalsis. Parasympathetic innervation enhances the peristalsis while sympathetic innervation inhibits it.

== Clinical significance ==
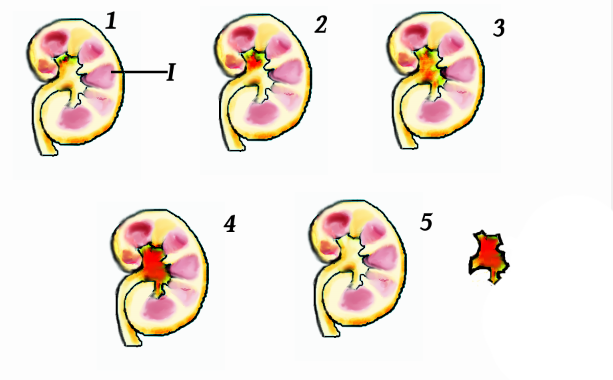
Example of a "staghorn" kidney stone projecting into the renal calyces

A "staghorn calculus" is a kidney stone that may extend into the renal calyces.

A renal diverticulum is diverticulum of renal calyces.

== See also ==
- Renal medulla
- Renal pyramids
- Calyx (anatomy)
