= Efferent arteriole =

Blood vessel carrying blood out away from glomerulus

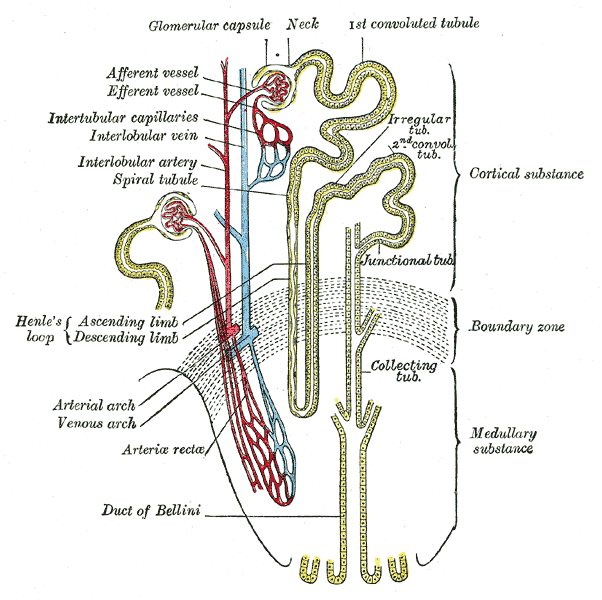
- Scheme of renal tubule and its vascular supply. (Label "Efferent vessel" is visible in upper left.)

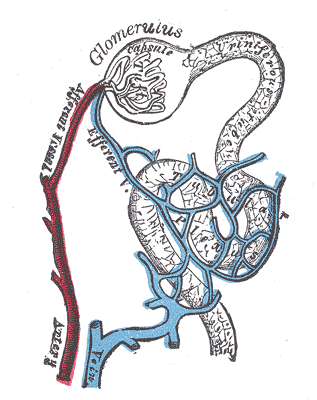
- Distribution of blood vessels in cortex of kidney.

Details
- Source: glomerular capillaries

Identifiers
- Latin: arteriola glomerularis efferens capsulae renalis
- TA98: A08.1.03.006
- FMA: 272214 77043, 272214

The efferent arterioles are blood vessels that are part of the urinary tract of organisms. Efferent (from Latin ex + ferre) means "outgoing", in this case meaning carrying blood out away from the glomerulus. The efferent arterioles form a convergence of the capillaries of the glomerulus, and carry blood away from the glomerulus that has already been filtered. They play an important role in maintaining the glomerular filtration rate despite fluctuations in blood pressure.

In the mammalian kidney, they follow two markedly different courses, depending on the location of the glomeruli from which they arise.

In the mammalian kidney, about 15% of glomeruli lie close to the boundary between the renal cortex and renal medulla and are known as juxtamedullary glomeruli. The rest are simply undifferentiated cortical glomeruli.

== In undifferentiated cortical glomeruli ==
The efferent arterioles of the undifferentiated cortical glomeruli are the most complex. Promptly on leaving the glomerulus they break up into capillaries and become part of a rich plexus of vessels surrounding the cortical portions of the renal tubules.

== In juxtamedullary glomeruli ==
The efferent arterioles of the juxtamedullary glomeruli are much different. They do break up, but they form bundles of vessels (arteriolae recti) that cross the outer zone of the medulla to perfuse the inner zone.

Vessels returning from the inner medulla (venulae recti) intersperse themselves in a highly regular fashion among the descending arteriolae recti to form a well-organized rete mirabile.

This rete is responsible for the osmotic isolation of the inner medulla from the rest of the kidney and so permits the excretion of a hypertonic urine when circumstances require. Since the rete also isolates the inner medulla from gaseous exchange, any metabolism in this area is anaerobic, and red cells, which would serve no purpose there, are ordinarily shunted from the arteriolae recti by an unknown mechanism into the capillary plexus surrounding the tubules of the outer zone of the medulla.

Blood in this plexus and returning from the inner medulla finds its way to the renal vein and the general circulation by pathways similar to those providing drainage for the rest of the cortex.

== Regulation of glomerular filtration rate ==
When angiotensin II levels are increased due to activation of the renin–angiotensin–aldosterone system, most of the arteries in the body experience vasoconstriction, in order to maintain adequate blood pressure. However, this reduces blood flow to the kidneys. To compensate, the efferent arterioles constrict to a greater degree than the other arteries, in response to increased levels of angiotensin II. Pressure in glomerular capillaries is therefore maintained and glomerular filtration rate remains adequate. However, in a state of very high angiotensin II for a prolonged period of time, the colloid oncotic pressure of the capillaries will increase, counteracting the increased hydrostatic pressure from the efferent constriction. This will decrease the glomerular filtration rate, depending on the level of oncotic increase in the capillaries, resulting in a decreased filtration fraction.

== See also ==
- Afferent arteriole

== Additional images ==
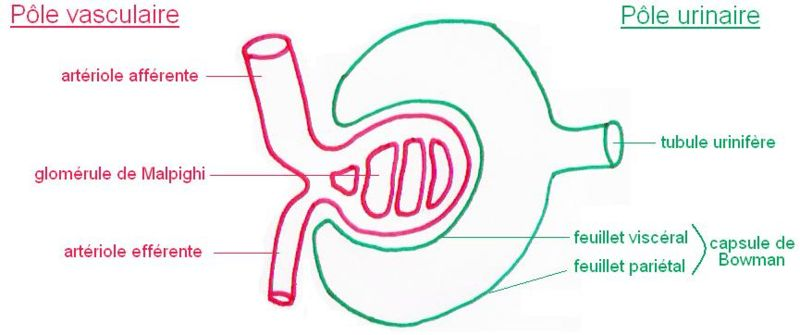
Malpighian corpuscle.

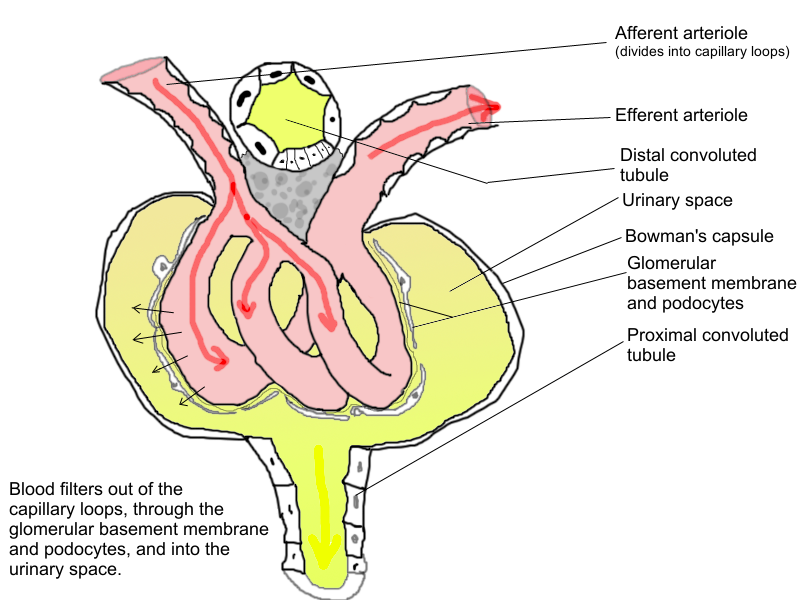
Glomerulus.

Renal corpuscle
