= Renal pelvis =

Dilated part of the ureter in the kidney

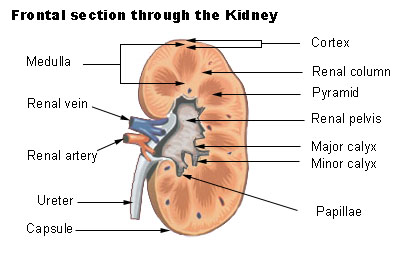
- Cross-section of the kidney, with major structures labelled. The renal pelvis, located in the middle of the image, collects urine from the urinary calices.

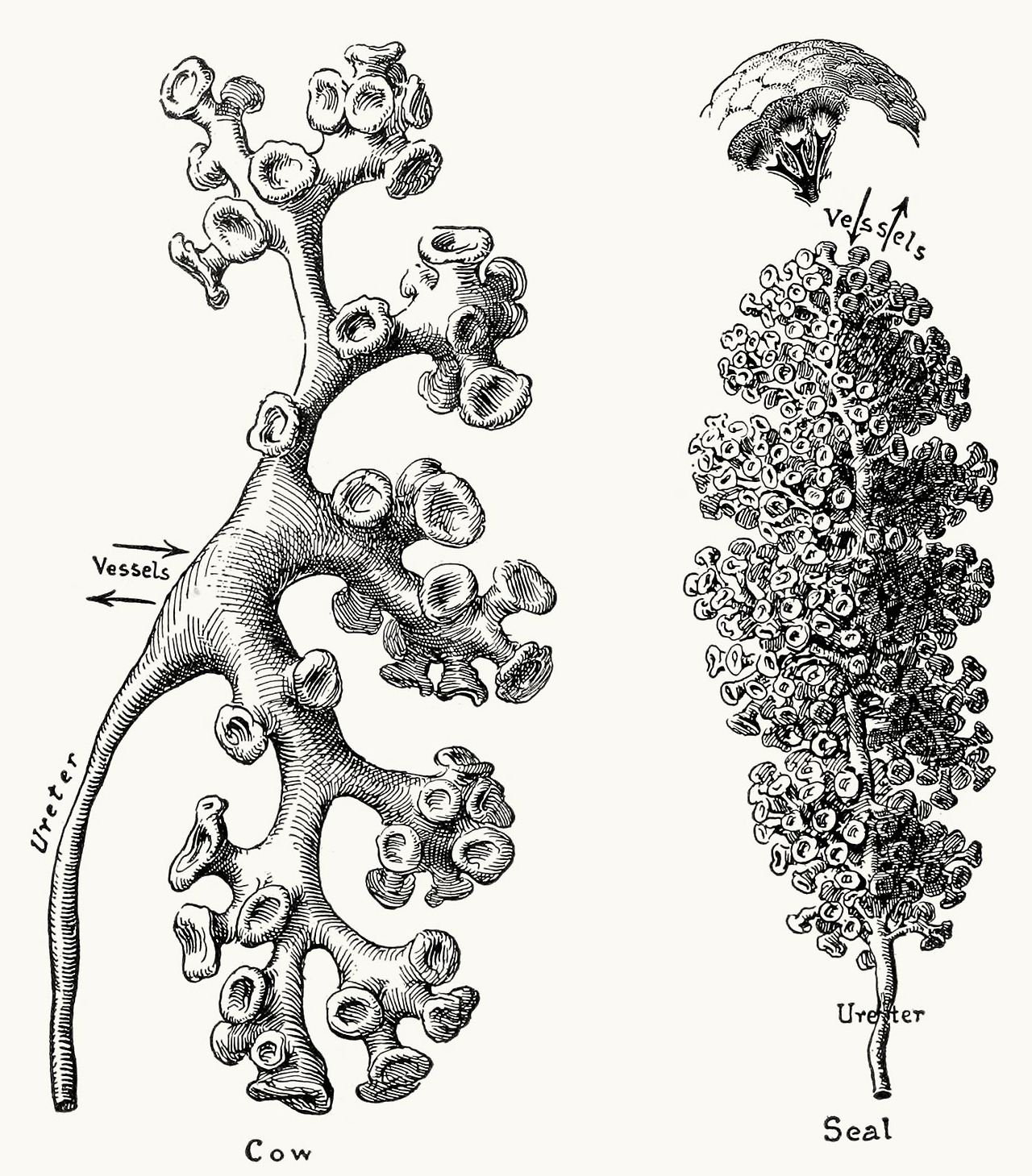
- An image showing just the pelvis and calices of the kidneys, with the rest of the kidney removed, from a dissected cow and seal specimen. These vary greatly in size and number depending on species.

Details
- Precursor: Ureteric bud
- System: Urinary system

Identifiers
- Latin: pelvis renalis
- MeSH: D007682
- TA98: A08.1.05.001
- TA2: 3384
- FMA: 15575

The renal pelvis or pelvis of the kidney is the funnel-like dilated part of the ureter in the kidney. It is formed by the convergence of the major calyces, acting as a funnel for urine flowing from the major calyces to the ureter. It has a mucous membrane and is covered with transitional epithelium and an underlying lamina propria of loose-to-dense connective tissue.

The renal pelvis is situated within the renal sinus alongside the other structures of the renal sinus.

== Clinical significance ==
The renal pelvis is the location of several kinds of kidney cancer and is affected by infection in pyelonephritis. A large "staghorn" kidney stone may block all or part of the renal pelvis.

The size of the renal pelvis plays a major role in the grading of hydronephrosis. Normally, the anteroposterior diameter of the renal pelvis is less than 4 mm in fetuses up to 32 weeks of gestational age and 7 mm afterwards. In adults, 13% of the normal population have a transverse pelvic diameter of over 10 mm.

== Etymology and pronunciation ==
Like the bony pelvis, the renal pelvis (/ˈriːnəl ˈpɛlvɪs/) gets its English name via Neo-Latin from the older Latin word pelvis, "basin", as in "wash basin". In both cases the name reflects the shape of the structure, and in the case of the renal pelvis, it also reflects the function. The name reflects that each renal pelvis collects urine from the calyces and funnels it into the ureter like a wash basin collects water and funnels it into a drain pipe. The renal pelvis is occasionally called the pyelum (from Greek πύελος pýelos, "trough", ‘anything hollow’), and the combining form pyelo- denotes the renal pelvis (pyelo- is not to be confused with pyo-). The words infundibulum and choana are other words for funnel-shaped cavities (which medical English got from the Latin and Greek words for "funnel", respectively), and the renal pelvis is sometimes called the renal infundibulum. The form *renal choana is logical but is not used.

== Additional images ==
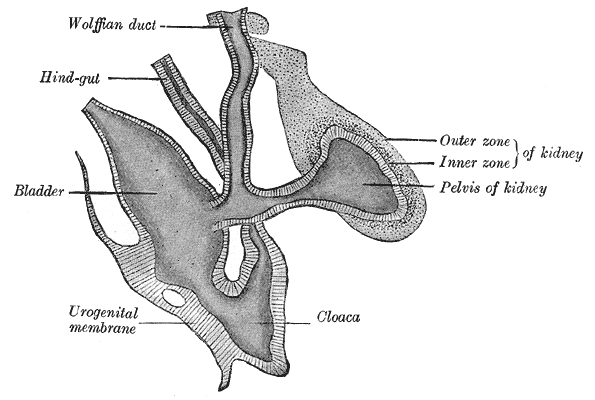
Depiction of the developing renal pelvis.

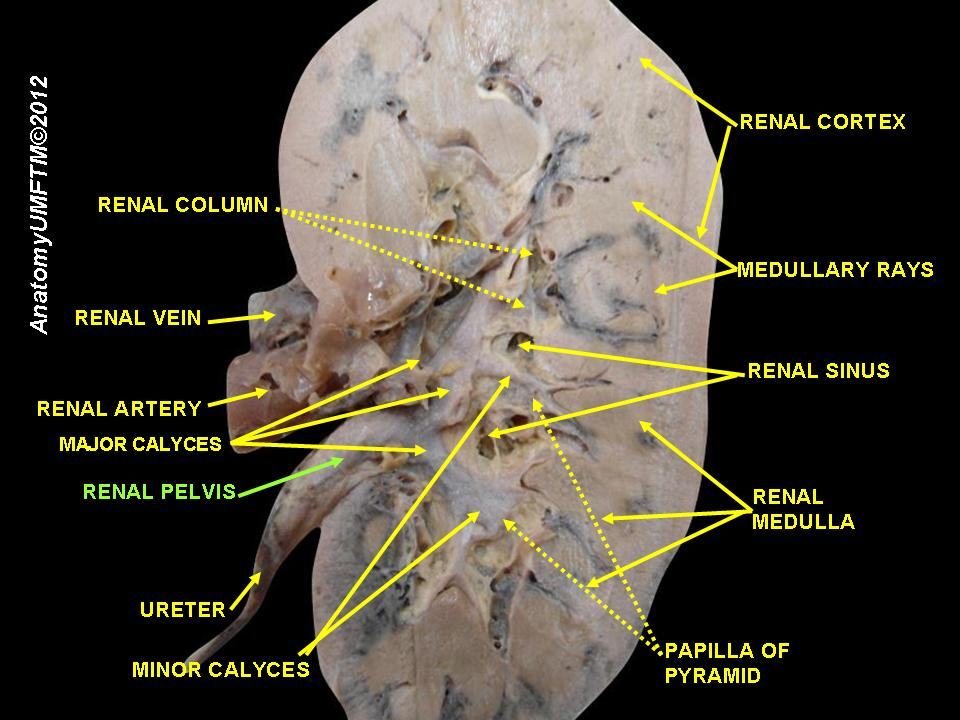
Cutaway section of a preserved human kidney

== See also ==
- Renal sinus
- Pyelectasis, the dilation of the renal pelvis
