= Renal capsule =

Layer surrounding kidney

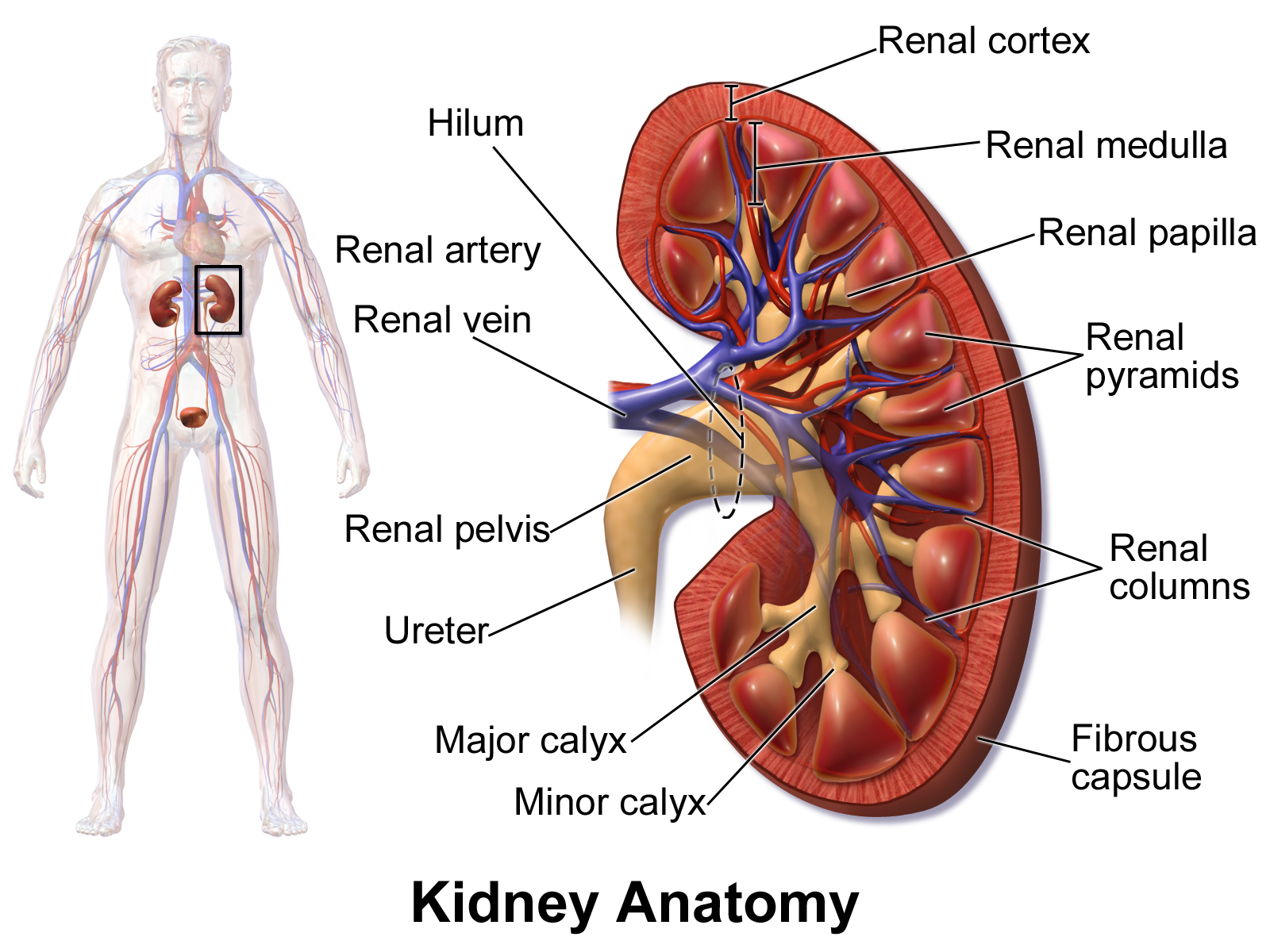
- The kidney capsule surrounds both kidneys, and is labelled at the bottom right.

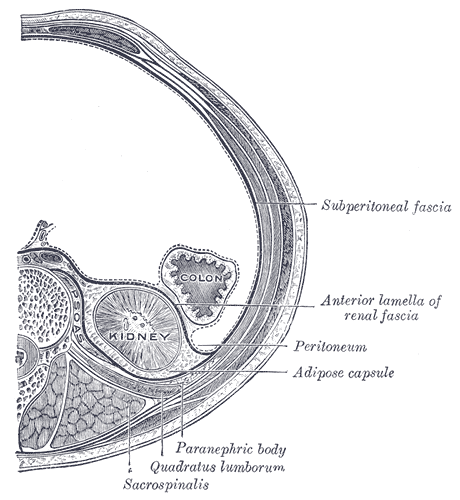
- Cross-section, showing the positioning of the kidney capsule

Details

Identifiers
- Latin: capsula fibrosa renis
- FMA: 66610

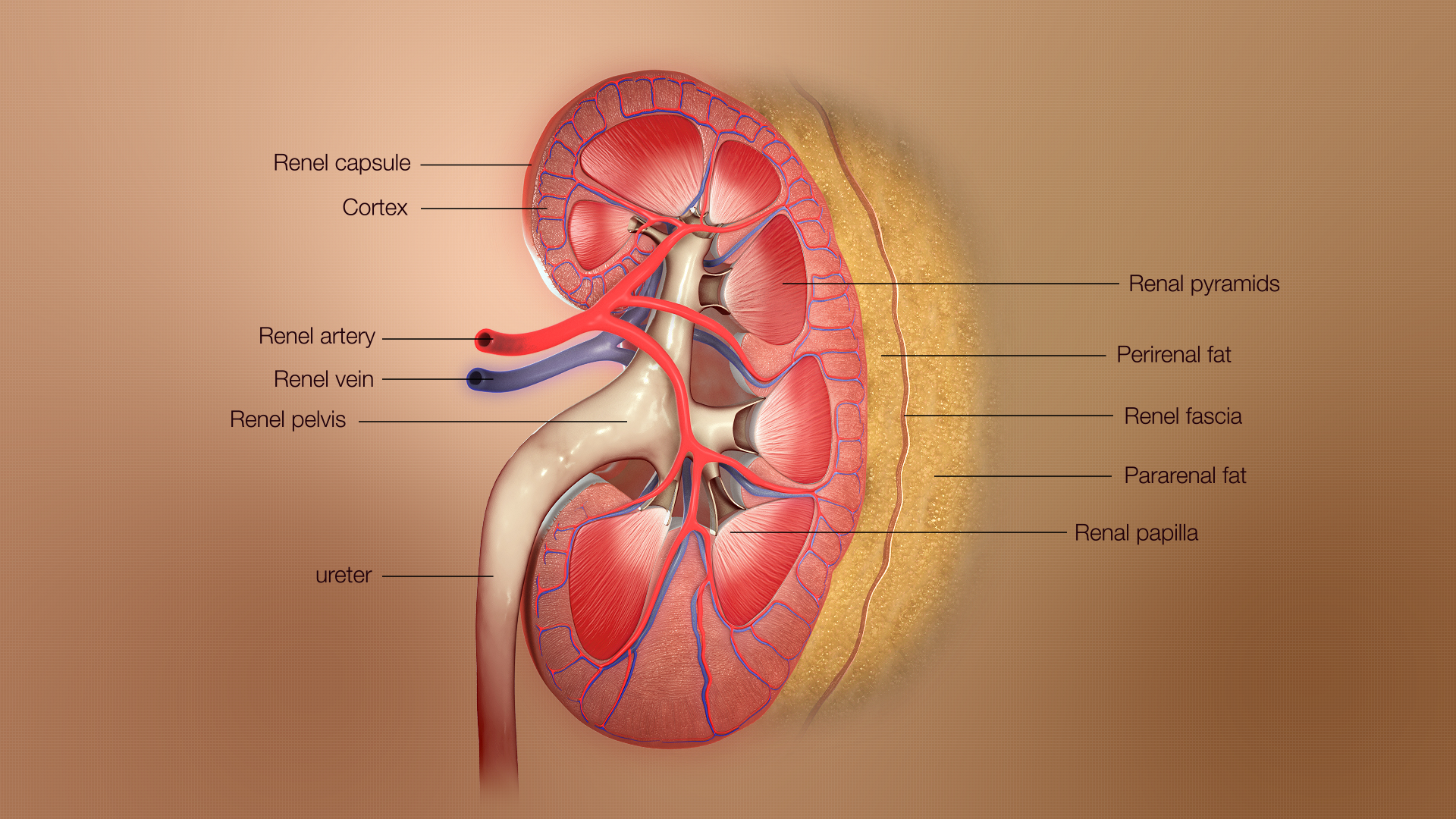
Different layers of kidney depicted in a 3D medical Illustration

The renal capsule is a tough fibrous layer surrounding the kidney and covered in a layer of perirenal fat known as the adipose capsule of kidney. The adipose capsule is sometimes included in the structure of the renal capsule. It provides some protection from trauma and damage. The renal capsule is surrounded by the renal fascia. Overlying the renal fascia and between this and the transverse fascia is a region of pararenal fat.

The renal capsule resists stretching, limiting renal swelling, with important implications for renal circulation. Stretching of the renal capsule due to swelling of the kidney causes flank pain.

== Structure ==
The renal capsule surrounds the functional tissue of the kidney, and is itself surrounded by a fatty adipose capsule, fascia, and fat. From the inner part of the kidney to outside the kidney, the positioning of the capsule is:

1. renal medulla
2. renal cortex
3. renal capsule
4. adipose capsule of kidney (or perirenal fat, or perinephric fat)
5. renal fascia
6. pararenal fat
7. peritoneum (anteriorly), and transverse fascia (posteriorly).

Sometimes the adipose capsule of the kidney also known as the perirenal fat, is regarded as a part of the renal capsule.

== See also ==
- Renal medulla
- Renal pyramid
- Renal artery
- Renal vein
