= Transplant glomerulopathy =

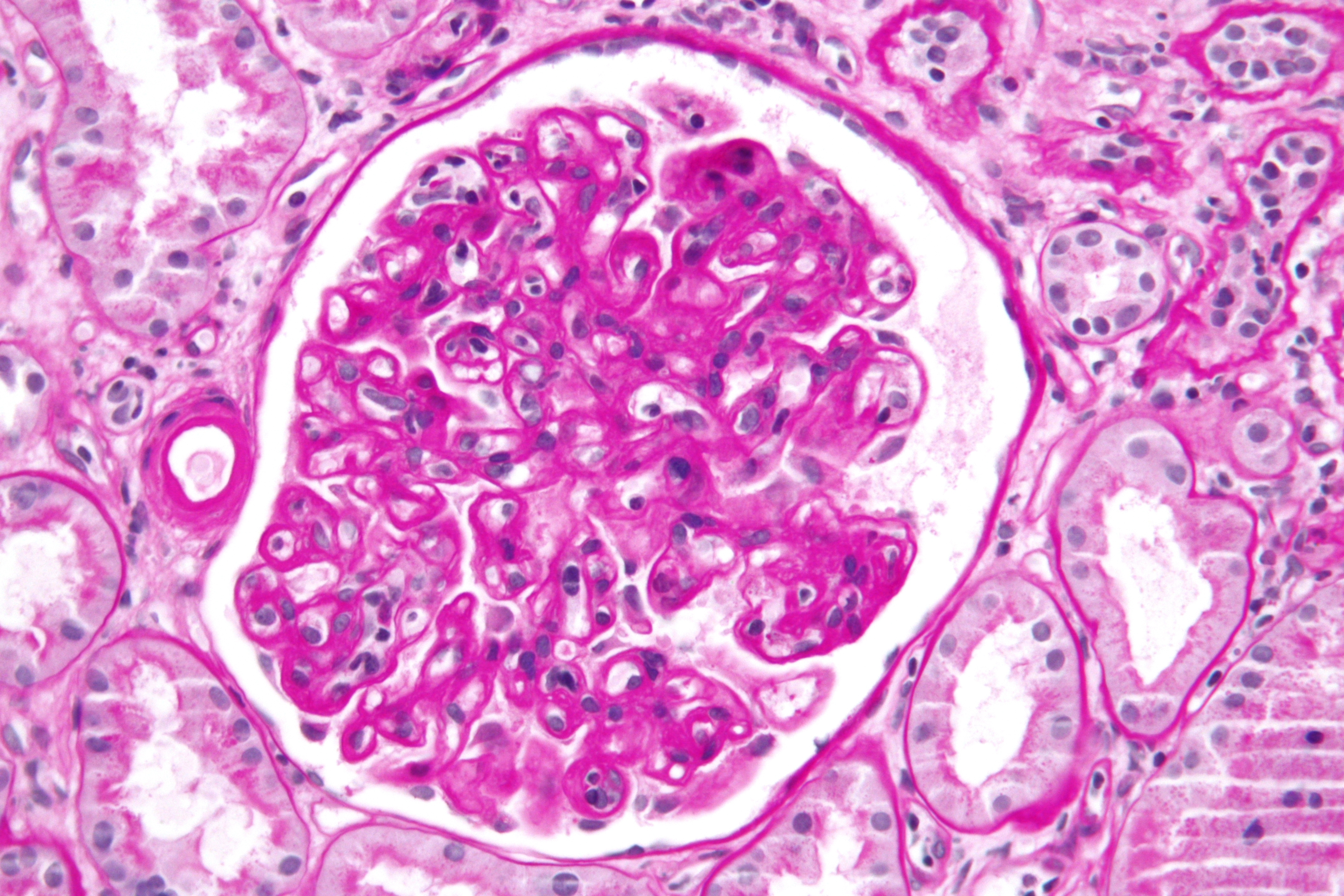
- Micrograph showing a glomerulus with changes characteristic of a transplant glomerulopathy. PAS stain.
- Specialty: Nephrology

Transplant glomerulopathy (TG) is a morphologic lesion of renal allografts that is histologically identified by glomerular basement membrane (GBM) duplication and/or multilayering. Proteinuria, hypertension, and deteriorating graft function are the hallmarks of TG.

Acute rejection, pre-transplant antibody levels, and de novo HLA antibodies are all linked to TG. There are further risks associated with HLA class II and/or donor-specific antibodies.

Five years after transplant, TG is present in 5–10% of renal allografts; in rare cases, protocol biopsies may reveal TG as a subclinical finding. With chronic alloantibody-mediated injury, the lesion is particularly associated with a poor prognosis for the outcome of the graft.

== Signs and symptoms ==
Transplant glomerulopathy (TG) may present as clinically silent and only be detected on biopsy.

Low-level proteinuria and/or a slight decline in glomerular filtration rate are examples of early clinical manifestations. However, as the lesion worsens, hypertension, a drop in glomerular filtration rate, and an increase in proteinuria, often into the nephrotic range, may occur.

=== Complications ===
Numerous studies have linked reduced allograft survival to transplant glomerulopathy.

== Causes ==
TG is thought to be a morphologic expression of chronic antibody-mediated rejection (ABMR) in most cases and is well-documented as being correlated with a buildup of donor-specific antibodies (DSAs), particularly against HLA class II antigens. But TG is not exclusive to chronic ABMR; in one-third to one-fourth of cases, thrombotic microangiopathy (TMA), hepatitis C, and possibly T cell-mediated rejection (TCMR) appear to be the alternative etiologies.

== Mechanism ==
Transplant glomerulopathy (TG) is a slowly developing, long-lasting damage to the glomerular capillary walls that is thought to result from long-term glomerular endothelial activation and injury. The glomerular basement membrane is also repaired and remodeled in conjunction with this condition. Reduced podocyte density and glomerular epithelial cell stress are also factors in transplant-related glomerular injury, which includes increased urine podocyte excretion in TG and significant podocyte detachment, both of which are linked to progressive glomerulosclerosis.

Out of all the suggested mechanisms, the one that has been documented the most is the correlation between donor-specific antibody against the human leukocyte antigen (anti-HLA-DSA), antibody-mediated mediated rejection (ABMR), and endothelial damage that results in the development of TG.

Clinical investigations have also demonstrated the connection between TG and humoral alloimmunity.TG is first thought to be the characteristic lesion of chronic ABMR. Compared to other transplants, HLA-incompatible transplants that need to be desensitized have a higher prevalence of TG. Patients with TG have consistently been found to have an increased prevalence of donor-specific anti-HLA antibodies (DSA) and an increased incidence of antecedent or concurrent ABMR. Apart from preformed DSA, de novo DSA development has also been linked to TG, indicating that pathogenetic relevance to TG also extends to either new or recurrent endothelial damage resulting from de novo DSA.

The most compelling evidence for the theory that non-HLA antibodies could cause ABMR has come from studies on HLA identical renal allograft recipients who developed anti-donor endothelial reactive antibodies. According to data, non-HLA auto- and alloantibodies may contribute to chronic graft loss either by themselves through cytotoxicity or in conjunction with anti-HLA antibodies.

Clinical biopsy studies showing TG lesions in the absence of discernible acute or chronic ABMR have raised the possibility that non-humoral mechanisms may be responsible for the TG pathogenesis in these cases.

It has long been believed that humoral immunity is the cause of microvascular inflammation (MVI), which occurs in conjunction with TG and ABMR.

== Diagnosis ==
Transplant glomerulopathy (TG) is best recognized histologically by reduplications or "double contours" of the glomerular basement membrane in peripheral glomerular capillary loops; basement membrane stains (methanamine silver and periodic acid-Schiff) work best for this kind of identification. Since it is a focal lesion in the early stages and only affects a small percentage of glomeruli, sufficient glomerular sampling is required. The lesion becomes more diffuse over time, accompanied by secondary focal segmental and global glomerulosclerosis and hyalinosis, variable mesangial matrix expansion (without the formation of mesangial nodules or significant mesangial cell proliferation), and associated glomerular hypertrophy. Severe nodular hyaline arteriolosclerosis, arterial fibrous intimal thickening, and progressive interstitial fibrosis and tubular atrophy are typically linked to advanced TG.

According to the Banff '97 criteria, double contours had to be present in at least 10% of the capillary loops in the most affected glomerulus in order to diagnose transplant glomerulopathy.

Immunofluorescence (IF) results for TG show no diagnostic staining for IgG, IgA, or C1q, as well as mild-to-moderate glomerular mesangial along with capillary wall deposition of IgM and C3.

=== Differential diagnosis ===
Differential diagnosis (DDX) of transplant glomerulopathy includes thrombotic microangiopathies, recurrent membranoproliferative glomerulonephritis, and ischemia.

== Treatment ==
The general management of patients with TG involves renin-angiotensin-aldosterone (RAAS) blockade, blood pressure and diabetes control, weight loss, and other strategies to lower intra-glomerular pressure.

== See also ==
- Kidney transplant
- Chronic rejection
