= Peripolar cell =

Type of glomerular epithelial cell

Peripolar cells are specialized epithelial cells. Peripolar cells are located within Bowman's capsule at its vascular pole. These cells were discovered at the vascular pole of the sheep glomerulus. The cells contain numerous cytoplasmic granules. The granules in peripolar cells are secretory, and the cells show features of secretory epithelial cells, although no exocytosis was observed. By secreting specific molecules, they may influence the composition of the filtrate and the reabsorption processes in the renal tubules. There is also ongoing research that if it is part of the juxtaglomerular apparatus (JGA). The number, size, and appearance of peripolar cells can vary across different mammalian species.
