= Mesangial cell =

Specialised kidney cells

Details
- Location: Mesangium of the glomeruli of kidneys

Identifiers
- MeSH: D050527
- FMA: 70972

Mesangial cells are specialised cells in the kidney that make up the mesangium of the glomerulus. Together with the mesangial matrix, they form the vascular pole of the renal corpuscle. The mesangial cell population accounts for approximately 30-40% of the total cells in the glomerulus. Mesangial cells can be categorized as either extraglomerular mesangial cells or intraglomerular mesangial cells, based on their relative location to the glomerulus. The extraglomerular mesangial cells are found between the afferent and efferent arterioles towards the vascular pole of the glomerulus. The extraglomerular mesangial cells are adjacent to the intraglomerular mesangial cells that are located inside the glomerulus and in between the capillaries. The primary function of mesangial cells is to remove trapped residues and aggregated protein from the basement membrane thus keeping the filter free of debris. The contractile properties of mesangial cells have been shown to be insignificant in changing the filtration pressure of the glomerulus.

== Structure ==
Mesangial cells (colored in purple) as seen within intraglomerular and extraglomerular mesangium.

Mesangial cells have irregular shapes with flattened-cylinder-like cell bodies and processes at both ends containing actin, myosin and actinin, giving mesangial cells contractile properties. The anchoring filaments from mesangial cells to the glomerular basement membrane can alter capillary flow by changing glomerular ultrafiltration surface area. Extraglomerular mesangial cells are in close connection to afferent and efferent arteriolar cells by gap junctions, allowing for intercellular communication. Mesangial cells are separated by intercellular spaces containing extracellular matrix called the mesangial matrix that is produced by the mesangial cells. Mesangial matrix provides structural support for the mesangium. Mesangial matrix is composed of glomerular matrix proteins such as collagen IV (α1 and α2 chains), collagen V, collagen VI, laminin A, B1, B2, fibronectin, and proteoglycans.

== Development ==
It is unclear whether the mesangial cells originate from mesenchymal or stromal cells. However there is evidence suggesting that they originate elsewhere outside of the glomerulus and then migrate into the glomerulus during development. Human foetal and infant kidneys stained for alpha smooth muscle actin (α-SMA), a marker for mesangial cells, demonstrated that α-SMA-positive mesenchymal cells migrate towards the glomerulus and during a later stage they can be found within the mesangium. It is possible that they share the same origin as supporting cells such as pericytes and vascular smooth muscle cells, or even be a type of specialised vascular smooth muscle cell.

== Function ==
=== Formation of capillary loops during development ===
During development mesangial cells are important in the formation of convoluted capillaries allowing for efficient diffusion to occur. Endothelial precursor cells secrete platelet-derived growth factor (PDGF)-B and mesangial cells have receptors for PDGF. This induces mesangial cells to attach to endothelial cells causing developing blood vessels to loop resulting in convoluted capillaries. Mice lacking the growth factor PDGF-B or PDGFRβ do not develop mesangial cells. When mesangial cells are absent the blood vessel becomes a single dilated vessel with up to 100-fold decrease in surface area. The transcription factor for PDGFRβ, Tbx18, is crucial for the development of mesangial cells. Without Tbx18 the development of mesangial cells is compromised and results in the formation of dilated loops. Mesangial cell progenitors are also a target of PDGF-B and can be selected for by the signal to then develop into mesangial cells.

=== Interactions with other renal cells ===
Mesangial cells form a glomerular functional unit with glomerular endothelial cells and podocytes through interactions of molecular signalling pathways which are essential for the formation of the glomerular tuft. Mesangial cells aid filtration by constituting part of the glomerular capillary tuft structure that filters fluids to produce urine. Communication between mesangial cells and vascular smooth muscle cells via gap junctions helps regulate the process of tubuloglomerular feedback and urine formation. Damage to mesangial cells using Thy 1-1 antibody specific to mesangial cells causes the vasoconstriction of arterioles mediated by tubuloglomerular feedback to be lost.

=== Contractions regulate capillary flow ===
Mesangial cells can contract and relax to regulate capillary flow. This is regulated by vasoactive substances. Contraction of mesangial cells is dependent on cell membrane permeability to calcium ions and relaxation is mediated by paracrine factors, hormones and cAMP. In response to capillary stretching, mesangial cells can respond by producing several growth factors: TGF-1, VEGF and connective tissue growth factor.

=== Removal of macromolecules ===
The mesangium is exposed to macromolecules from the capillary lumen as they are separated only by fenestrated endothelium without basement membrane. Mesangial cells play a role in restricting macromolecules from accumulating in the mesangial space by receptor- independent uptake processes of phagocytosis, micro- and macro-pinocytosis, or receptor-dependent processes and then transported along the mesangial stalk. Size, charge, concentration, and affinity for mesangial cell receptors of the macromolecule affects how the macromolecule is removed. Triglycerides may undergo pinocytosis and antibody IgG complexes may lead to activation of adhesion molecules and chemokines by mesangial cells. They also regulate glomerular filtration.

== Clinical significance ==
=== Diabetic nephropathy ===
The expansion of mesangial matrix is one characteristic of diabetic nephropathy although it also involves other cells in interaction including podocytes and endothelial cells. Mesangial expansion occurs due to increased deposition of extracellular matrix proteins, for example fibronectin, into the mesangium. Accumulation of extracellular matrix proteins then occurs due to insufficient degradation by matrix metalloproteinases.

Increased glucose levels results in the activation of metabolic pathways leading to increased oxidative stress. This in turn results in the over-production and accumulation of advanced glycosylation end products responsible for enhancing the risk of developing glomerular diseases. Mesangial cells grown on advanced glycosylation end product-modified matrix proteins demonstrate increased production of fibronectin and a decrease in proliferation. These factors eventually lead to the thickening of the glomerular basement membrane, mesangial matrix expansion then glomerulosclerosis and fibrosis.

Mesangial pathologies may also develop during the early phase of diabetes. Glomerular hypertension causes mesangial cells to stretch which causes induced expression of GLUT1 leading to increased cellular glucose. The repetition of stretching and relaxation cycle of mesangial cells due to hypertension increases mesangial cell proliferation and the production of extracellular matrix which can then accumulate and lead to glomerular disease.

== See also ==
- List of human cell types derived from the germ layers
- List of distinct cell types in the adult human body
