= Glomerulosclerosis =

- Other names: Glomerular sclerosis
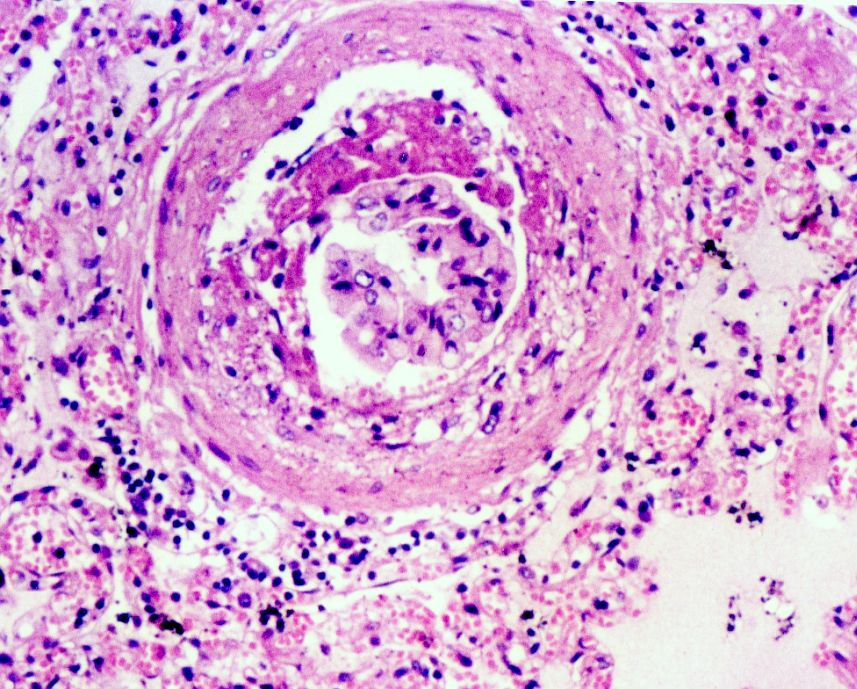
- Kidney biopsy specimen shown under microscope demonstrating glomerulosclerosis secondary to high blood pressure
- Specialty: Nephrology
- Symptoms: Fatigue, malaise, headache, swelling, nausea, vomiting
- Types: Focal segmental glomerulosclerosis, Nodular glomerulosclerosis
- Causes: Diabetes, malignancy, drug use, genetic inheritance, idiopathic, etc.
- Diagnostic method: Proteinuria on urine study and kidney biopsy with evidence of scarring

Glomerulosclerosis is the hardening of the glomeruli in the kidney, which hinders the kidneys' ability to properly filter blood and results in kidney disease. It is a general term to describe scarring of the kidneys' glomeruli, the tiny blood vessels that serve as the functional units in the kidney for filtration of the blood.

Both children and adults can develop glomerulosclerosis which can arise from different kidney conditions. Nodular glomerulosclerosis is one frequently encountered type of glomerulosclerosis and is most commonly caused by diabetes. Focal segmental glomerulosclerosis (FSGS) is another type of glomerulosclerosis and can result from malignancies, drugs, infections, or genetic inheritance, though it may also occur without an identifiable cause.

Proteinuria (large amounts of protein in the urine) is the major sign of glomerulosclerosis. Scarring disturbs the filtering process of the kidneys and allows protein to leak from the blood into the urine. Symptoms of glomerulosclerosis may include swelling, fatigue, nausea and vomiting, itchy skin, poor appetite, or shortness breath, among others.

A kidney biopsy (the sampling of a tiny part of the kidney with a needle) may be necessary to determine whether a patient has glomerulosclerosis or another kidney problem. Kidney biopsy of a patient with glomerulosclerosis may show glomerular scarring and podocyte damage, as well as more specific findings associated with each type of glomerulosclerosis.

Treatment of glomerulosclerosis depends on the type, but may include medications such as antihypertensives, steroids, or glucose-lowering agents depending on the cause.

== Anatomy and pathophysiology ==
The kidney serves many functions within the human body. These include clearing waste, balancing acids and bases, managing blood pressure, and controlling electrolyte levels. These roles stem from the kidneys' structural components and their organization. Each kidney is divided into the renal parenchyma, which performs filtration of the blood into urine, and the collecting system, which helps transport the urine for excretion.

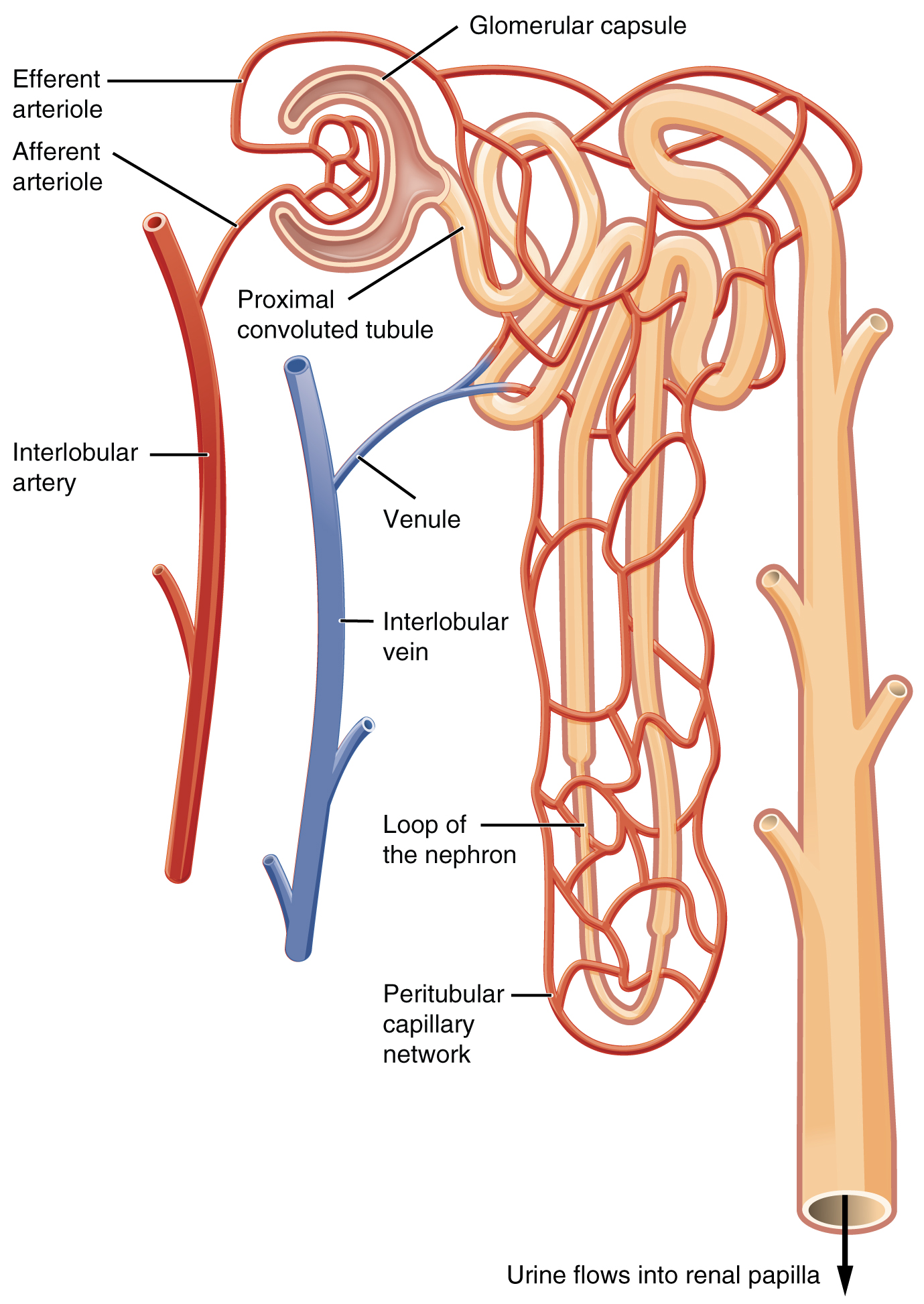
Anatomy of the nephron

Within the renal parenchyma lies the nephron, which is the functional unit of the kidney. The nephron consists of the blood-filtering renal corpuscle and the tubular fluid containing renal tubule. The corpuscle features the glomerulus and a capsule known as Bowman's capsule. As the blood enters the nephron, it must first pass through the filtration membrane, which is composed of fenestrated endothelium, a basement membrane, and podocyte processes. The resulting fluid is then filtered further throughout the various tubular segments to become urine.

Podocytes are a particularly important component of the filtration membrane due to their ability to synthesize glomerular basement components, form the slit membrane, and ensuring the health of endothelial cells. These cells can be subject to a lot of stress, though, especially in the setting of chronic conditions such as high blood pressure and diabetes. As podocytes are exposed to excessive stress, they undergo maladaptation which includes foot process effacement, podocyte hypertrophy, disruption in the slit molecule and actin system, and eventual cell death. These changes cause detachment from the basement membrane and subsequent proteinuria and glomerulosclerosis. This is further exacerbated by the fact that podocytes do not have proliferative potential and thus cannot be regenerated. These cellular changes also cause a chronic state of inflammation that further worsen tissue injury and ultimately result in scarring.

== Etiology ==
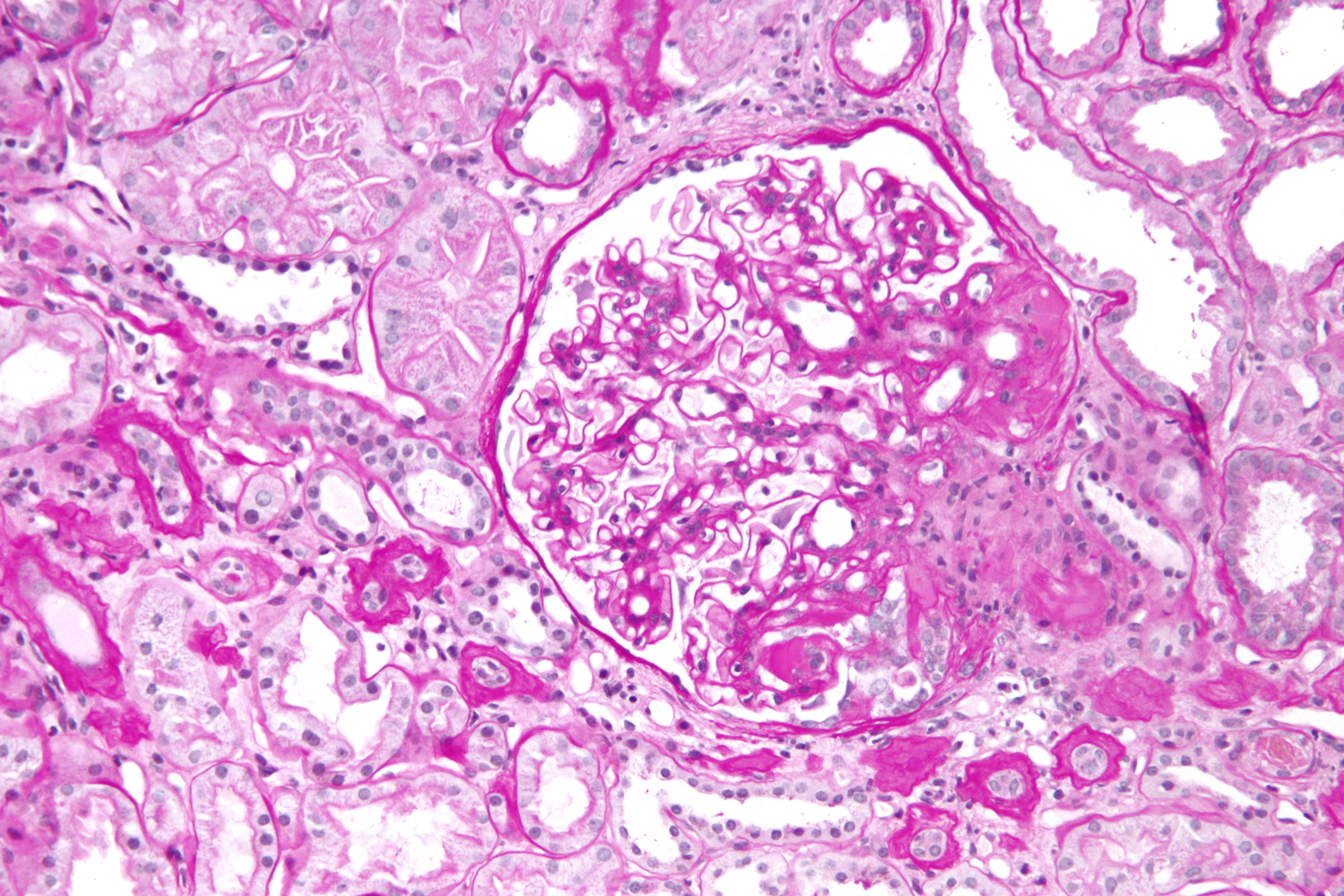
Histopathological image demonstrating focal segmental glomerulosclerosis

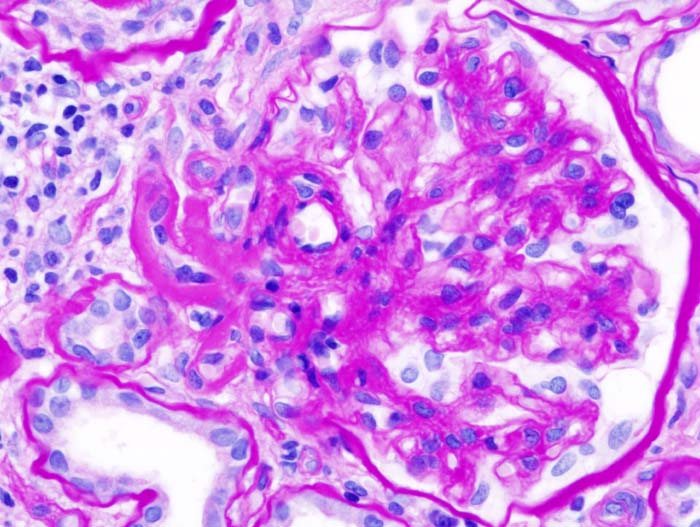
Histopathological image of Kimmestiel-Wilson nodules and diabetic glomerulosclerosis

More specifically, glomerulosclerosis can refer to:

- Focal segmental glomerulosclerosis (FSGS)
  - A group of diseases characterized by a histological pattern of glomerular scars that occur segmentally (affecting ≤50% of a glomerual tuft) and focally (affecting ≤50% of all glomeruli)
  - Divided into three types based on cause: Primary (idiopathic), Secondary (malignancy, drug use, post-infective, post-inflammatory, vascular), and Genetic
  - Comprises 35% of biopsy-confirmed cases of nephrotic syndrome, 40% of glomerular kidney disease case in adults, and 20% of glomerular kidney disease cases in children
- Nodular glomerulosclerosis
  - Most commonly associated with diabetic nephropathy as one of the most frequent and severe complications of Diabetes MellitusHistological pattern includes Kimmelstiel-Wilson nodules
  - May also be associated with dysproteinemia, amyloidosis, high blood pressure, and smoking

== Signs and symptoms ==
The hallmark sign of glomerulosclerosis is proteinuria, which refers to the leaking of protein into urine as it is filtered through the kidneys. Though patients can be otherwise asymptomatic in the presence of proteinuria, progression of kidney disease can result in further complications, such as swelling, uremia, fatigue, headache, nausea and vomiting, poor appetite, shortness of breath, irregular heartbeat, or itchy skin.

== Diagnosis ==
Evaluation for glomerulosclerosis usually begins with a urine study to determine the presence of proteinuria. In the case of FSGS, this may be initiated by the abrupt onset of nephrotic syndrome (leaking of greater than 3.5g/day) or evidence of worsening kidney function on routine laboratory evaluation. In the case of nodular glomerulosclerosis, screening for microalbuminuria is performed annually and is initiated either 5 years after diagnosis with type 1 diabetes or upon diagnosis with type 2 diabetes. In both cases, the discovery of otherwise unexplained proteinuria usually warrants further workup by a renal biopsy for histological evaluation, including histochemistry, immunofluorescence, and electron microscopy.

== Treatment ==
Treatment for glomerulosclerosis is targeted at the conditions that originally caused the scarring of the glomeruli and is usually led by a nephrologist. The goal of treatment is to slow diseases progression and improve kidney function. Additionally, lifestyle modifications aimed at mitigating risks factors such as smoking and obesity have been shown to have a positive impact on slowing the progression of kidney disease due to glomerulosclerosis.

For glomerulosclerosis secondary to diabetes, management includes a regimen of RAAS blockers for blood pressure control, SGLT-2 inhibitors to lower blood sugar, weight loss, and dietary changes such as eating less protein and cholesterol. Newer therapies that have been studied in the use of diabetic nephropathy include endothelin-1 receptor A antagonists, mineralocorticoid receptor antagonists, and TGF-β inhibitors, among others, which have demonstrated varying degrees of success.

For focal segmental glomerulosclerosis, management includes blood pressure control with the use of RAAS blockers but is also further directed based on the type of FSGS. For Primary FSGS, management may involve the use of immunosuppressive medications such as glucocorticoids or calcineurin inhibitors, immune modulative medications such as rituximab, treatments to reduce circulating permeability factors such as plasmapharesis, or antifibrotic agents such as adalimumab. For Secondary FSGS, treatment will be aimed at addressing the insulting factor. Treatment of genetic FSGS usually consists of genetic testing and individualized treatment. In all variations of FSGS, risk factors such as smoking, weight loss, and glucose control are also considered.

Severe and untreated disease is associated with poor cardiovascular outcomes and progression to end-stage renal disease (ESRD).
