= Nephron =

Microscopic structural and functional unit of the kidney

- Diagram (left) of a long juxtamedullary nephron and (right) of a short cortical nephron. The left nephron is labelled with six named nephron segments. Collecting duct is the last part of the nephron.

Details
- Precursor: Metanephric blastema (intermediate mesoderm)
- System: Urinary system

Identifiers
- MeSH: D009399
- FMA: 17640

The nephron is the minute or microscopic structural and functional unit of the kidney. It is composed of a renal corpuscle and a renal tubule. The renal corpuscle consists of a tuft of capillaries called a glomerulus and a cup-shaped structure called Bowman's capsule. The renal tubule extends from the capsule. The capsule and tubule are connected and are composed of epithelial cells with a lumen. A healthy adult has 1 to 1.5 million nephrons in each kidney. Blood is filtered as it passes through three layers: the endothelial cells of the capillary wall, its basement membrane, and between the podocyte foot processes of the lining of the capsule. The tubule has adjacent peritubular capillaries that run between the descending and ascending portions of the tubule. As the fluid from the capsule flows down into the tubule, it is processed by the epithelial cells lining the tubule: water is reabsorbed and substances are exchanged (some are added, others are removed); first with the interstitial fluid outside the tubules, and then into the plasma in the adjacent peritubular capillaries through the endothelial cells lining that capillary. This process regulates the volume of body fluid as well as levels of many body substances. At the end of the tubule, the remaining fluid—urine—exits: it is composed of water, metabolic waste, and toxins.

The interior of Bowman's capsule, called Bowman's space, collects the filtrate from the filtering capillaries of the glomerular tuft, which also contains mesangial cells supporting these capillaries. These components function as the filtration unit and make up the renal corpuscle. The filtering structure (glomerular filtration barrier) has three layers composed of endothelial cells, a basement membrane, and podocyte foot processes. The tubule has five anatomically and functionally different parts: the proximal tubule, which has a convoluted section called the proximal convoluted tubule followed by a straight section (proximal straight tubule); the loop of Henle, which has two parts, the descending loop of Henle ("descending loop") and the ascending loop of Henle ("ascending loop"); the distal convoluted tubule ("distal loop"); the connecting tubule, and the last part of nephron the collecting ducts. Nephrons have two lengths with different urine-concentrating capacities: long juxtamedullary nephrons and short cortical nephrons.

The four mechanisms used to create and process the filtrate (the result of which is to convert blood to urine) are filtration, reabsorption, secretion and excretion. Filtration or ultrafiltration occurs in the glomerulus and is largely passive: it is dependent on the intracapillary blood pressure. About one-fifth of the plasma is filtered as the blood passes through the glomerular capillaries; four-fifths continues into the peritubular capillaries. Normally the only components of the blood that are not filtered into Bowman's capsule are blood proteins, red blood cells, white blood cells and platelets. Over 150 liters of fluid enter the glomeruli of an adult every day: 99% of the water in that filtrate is reabsorbed. Reabsorption occurs in the renal tubules and is either passive, due to diffusion, or active, due to pumping against a concentration gradient. Secretion also occurs in the tubules and collecting duct and is active. Substances reabsorbed include: water, sodium chloride, glucose, amino acids, lactate, magnesium, calcium phosphate, uric acid, and bicarbonate. Substances secreted include urea, creatinine, potassium, hydrogen, and uric acid. Some of the hormones which signal the tubules to alter the reabsorption or secretion rate, and thereby maintain homeostasis, include (along with the substance affected) antidiuretic hormone (water), aldosterone (sodium, potassium), parathyroid hormone (calcium, phosphate), atrial natriuretic peptide (sodium) and brain natriuretic peptide (sodium). A countercurrent system in the renal medulla provides the mechanism for generating a hypertonic interstitium, which allows the recovery of solute-free water from within the nephron and returning it to the venous vasculature when appropriate.

Some diseases of the nephron predominantly affect either the glomeruli or the tubules. Glomerular diseases include diabetic nephropathy, glomerulonephritis and IgA nephropathy; renal tubular diseases include acute tubular necrosis and polycystic kidney disease.

== Structure ==
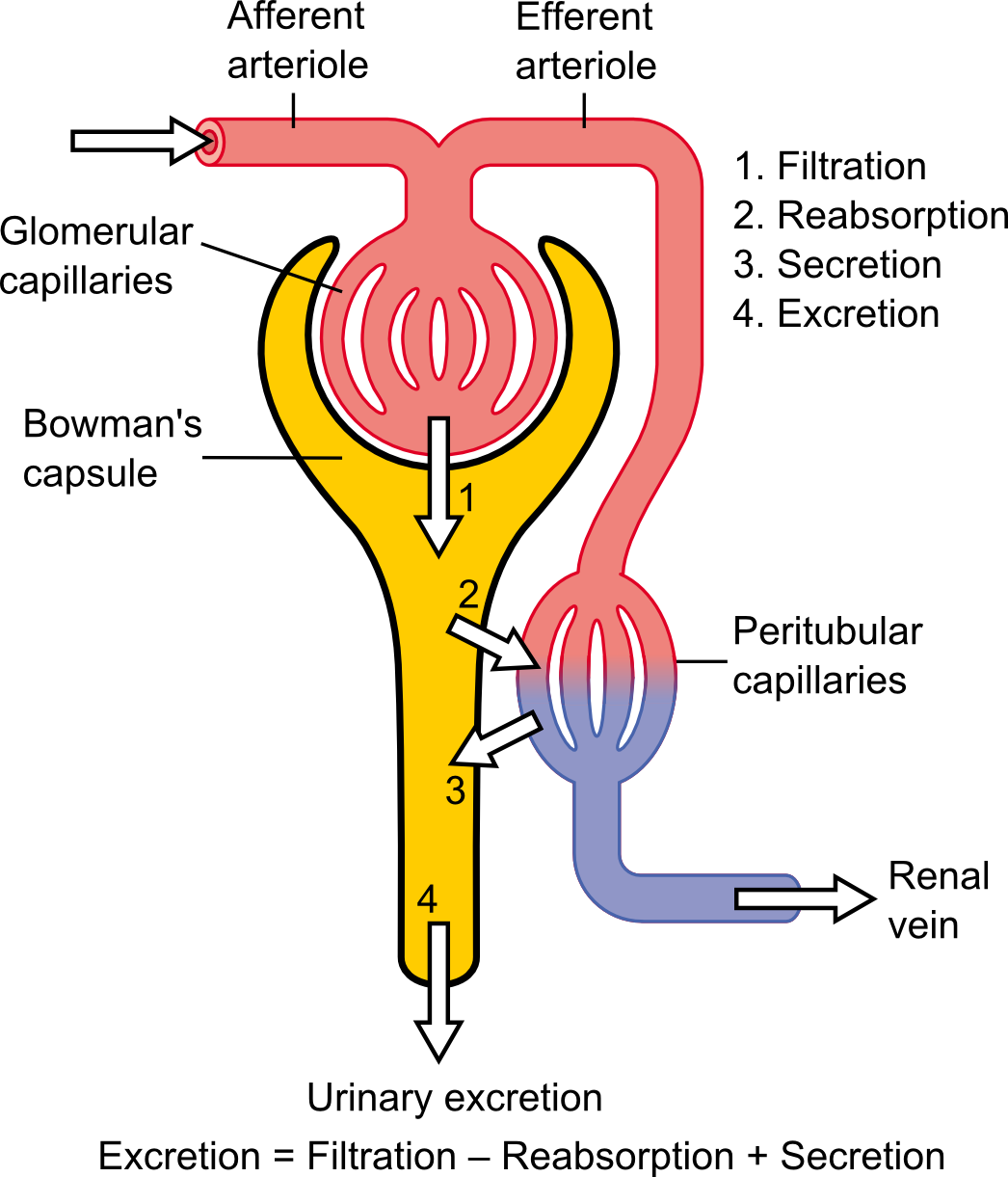
Fig.1) Schematic diagram of the nephron (yellow), relevant circulation (red/blue), and the four methods of altering the filtrate.

The nephron is the functional unit of the kidney. This means that each separate nephron is where the main work of the kidney is performed.

A nephron is made of-

- a renal corpuscle, which is the initial filtering component, and
- a renal tubule that processes and carries away the filtered fluid.

=== Renal corpuscle ===
Fig.2) Schematic of the glomerular filtration barrier (GFB). A. The endothelial cells of the glomerulus; 1. endothelial pore (fenestra). B. Glomerular basement membrane: 1. lamina rara interna 2. lamina densa 3. lamina rara externa C. Podocytes: 1. enzymatic and structural proteins 2. filtration slit 3. diaphragm

The renal corpuscle is the site of the filtration of blood plasma. The renal corpuscle consists of the glomerulus, and the glomerular capsule or Bowman's capsule.

The renal corpuscle has two poles: a vascular pole and a tubular pole. The arterioles from the renal circulation enter and leave the glomerulus at the vascular pole. The glomerular filtrate leaves the Bowman's capsule at the renal tubule at the urinary pole.

=== Glomerulus ===
The glomerulus is the network, known as a tuft, of filtering capillaries located at the vascular pole of the renal corpuscle in Bowman's capsule. Each glomerulus receives its blood supply from an afferent arteriole of the renal circulation. The glomerular blood pressure provides the driving force for water and solutes to be filtered out of the blood plasma, and into the interior of Bowman's capsule, called Bowman's space.

Only about a fifth of the plasma is filtered in the glomerulus. The rest passes into an efferent arteriole. The diameter of the efferent arteriole is smaller than that of the afferent, and this difference increases the hydrostatic pressure in the glomerulus.

=== Bowman's capsule ===
The Bowman's capsule, also called the glomerular capsule, surrounds the glomerulus. It is composed of a visceral inner layer formed by specialized cells called podocytes, and a parietal outer layer composed of simple squamous epithelium. Fluids from blood in the glomerulus are ultrafiltered through several layers, resulting in what is known as the filtrate.

The filtrate next moves to the renal tubule, where it is further processed to form urine. The different stages of this fluid are collectively known as the tubular fluid.

=== Renal tubule ===
The renal tubule is a continuous and long pipe-like structure containing the tubular fluid filtered through the glomerulus. The filtrate passing through the renal tubule ultimately ends at the collecting duct system.

The components of the renal tubule are:

1. Proximal convoluted tubule: lies in the cortex and is lined by 'simple cuboidal epithelium with brush borders' which greatly increase surface area for absorption.
2. Loop of Henle: lies in the medulla and is U-shaped (similar to a hair-pin)
  - Descending limb of loop of Henle: one segment of equal thickness
  - Ascending limb of loop of Henle: two segments of differing thickness (proximal portion lined by simple squamous epithelium is called the thin ascending limb of loop of Henle, distal portion lined by simple cuboidal epithelium is called the thick ascending limb of loop of Henle).
3. Distal convoluted tubule: lies in the cortex
4. Collecting tubule

The epithelial cells that form these nephron segments can be distinguished by the shapes of their actin cytoskeleton visualized by confocal microscopy of fluorescent phalloidin.

Blood from the efferent arteriole, containing everything that was not filtered out in the glomerulus, moves into the peritubular capillaries, tiny blood vessels that surround the loop of Henle and the proximal and distal tubules, where the tubular fluid flows. Substances then reabsorb from the latter back to the blood stream.

The peritubular capillaries then recombine to form an efferent venule, which combines with efferent venules from other nephrons into the renal vein, and rejoins the main bloodstream.

=== Difference in Length of Nephrons ===
Cortical nephrons (the majority of nephrons) start high in the cortex and have a short loop of Henle which does not penetrate deeply into the medulla. Cortical nephrons can be subdivided into superficial cortical nephrons and midcortical nephrons.

Juxtamedullary nephrons start low in the cortex near the medulla and have a long loop of Henle which penetrates deeply into the renal medulla: only they have their loop of Henle surrounded by the vasa recta. These long loops of Henle and their associated vasa recta create a hyperosmolar gradient that allows for the generation of concentrated urine. Also the hairpin bend penetrates up to the inner zone of medulla.

Juxtamedullary nephrons are found only in birds and mammals, and have a specific location: medullary refers to the renal medulla, while juxta (Latin: near) refers to the relative position of the renal corpuscle of this nephron - near the medulla, but still in the cortex. In other words, a juxtamedullary nephron is a nephron whose renal corpuscle is near the medulla, and whose proximal convoluted tubule and its associated loop of Henle occur deeper in the medulla than the other type of nephron, the cortical nephron.

The juxtamedullary nephrons comprise only about 15% of the nephrons in the human kidney. However, it is this type of nephron which is most often depicted in illustrations of nephrons.

In humans, cortical nephrons have their renal corpuscles in the outer two thirds of the cortex, whereas juxtamedullary nephrons have their corpuscles in the inner third of the cortex.

== Functions ==
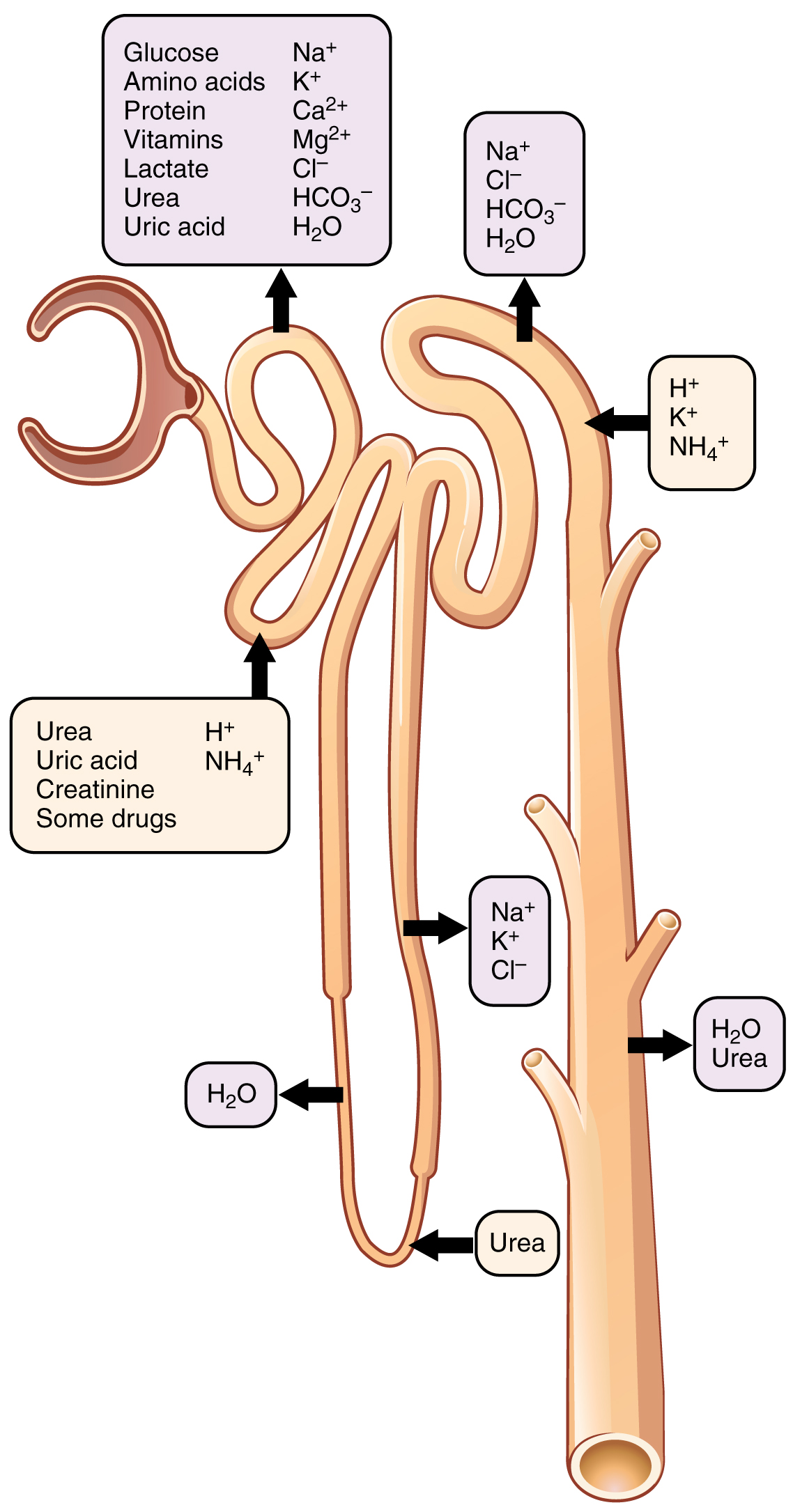
Fig.3) Secretion and reabsorption of various substances throughout the nephron.

The nephron uses four mechanisms to convert blood into urine: filtration, reabsorption, secretion, and excretion. These apply to numerous substances. The structure and function of the epithelial cells lining the lumen change during the course of the nephron, and have segments named by their location and which reflects their different functions.

Fig.4) Diagram outlining movement of ions in nephron, with the collecting ducts on the right.

Fig.5) Proximal tubule cell showing pumps involved in acid base balance, left is the lumen of tubule

=== Proximal tubule ===
The proximal tubule as a part of the nephron can be divided into an initial convoluted portion and a following straight (descending) portion. Fluid in the filtrate entering the proximal convoluted tubule is reabsorbed into the peritubular capillaries, including 80% of glucose, more than half of the filtered salt, water and all filtered organic solutes (primarily glucose and amino acids).

=== Loop of Henle ===
The loop of Henle is a U-shaped tube that extends from the proximal tubule. It consists of a descending limb and an ascending limb. It begins in the cortex, receiving filtrate from the proximal convoluted tubule, extends into the medulla as the descending limb, and then returns to the cortex as the ascending limb to empty into the distal convoluted tubule. The primary role of the loop of Henle is to enable an organism to produce concentrated urine, not by increasing the tubular concentration, but by rendering the interstitial fluid hypertonic.

Considerable differences aid in distinguishing the descending and ascending limbs of the loop of Henle. The descending limb is permeable to water and noticeably less permeable to salt, and thus only indirectly contributes to the concentration of the interstitium. As the filtrate descends deeper into the hypertonic interstitium of the renal medulla, water flows freely out of the descending limb by osmosis until the tonicity of the filtrate and interstitium equilibrate. The hypertonicity of the medulla (and therefore concentration of urine) is determined in part by the size of the loops of Henle.

Unlike the descending limb, the thick ascending limb is impermeable to water, a critical feature of the countercurrent exchange mechanism employed by the loop. The ascending limb actively pumps sodium out of the filtrate, generating the hypertonic interstitium that drives countercurrent exchange. In passing through the ascending limb, the filtrate grows hypotonic since it has lost much of its sodium content. This hypotonic filtrate is passed to the distal convoluted tubule in the renal cortex.

=== Distal convoluted tubule ===
The distal convoluted tubule has a different structure and function to that of the proximal convoluted tubule. Cells lining the tubule have numerous mitochondria to produce enough energy (ATP) for active transport to take place. Much of the ion transport taking place in the distal convoluted tubule is regulated by the endocrine system. In the presence of parathyroid hormone, the distal convoluted tubule reabsorbs more calcium and secretes more phosphate. When aldosterone is present, more sodium is reabsorbed and more potassium secreted. Ammonia is also absorbed during the selective reabsorption. Atrial natriuretic peptide causes the distal convoluted tubule to secrete more sodium.

=== Connecting tubule ===
A part of Distal nephron. This is the final segment of the tubule before it enters the collecting duct system. Water, some salts and nitrogenous waste like urea and creatinine are passed out to collecting tubule.

=== Collecting duct system ===
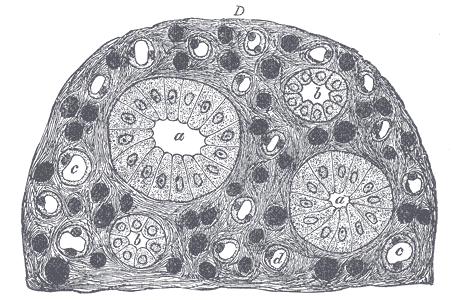
Fig.6) Cross-sectional histologic preparation showing (b)small connecting tubules with simple columnar epithelium and (a) large connecting tubules with simple cuboidal epithelium.

Each distal convoluted tubule delivers its filtrate to a system of collecting ducts, the first segment of which is the connecting tubule. The collecting duct system begins in the renal cortex and extends deep into the medulla. As the urine travels down the collecting duct system, it passes by the medullary interstitium which has a high sodium concentration as a result of the loop of Henle's countercurrent multiplier system.

Because it has a different origin during the development of the urinary and reproductive organs than the rest of the nephron, the collecting duct is sometimes not considered a part of the nephron. Instead of originating from the metanephrogenic blastema, the collecting duct originates from the ureteric bud.

Though the collecting duct is normally impermeable to water, it becomes permeable in the presence of antidiuretic hormone (ADH). ADH affects the function of aquaporins, resulting in the reabsorption of water molecules as it passes through the collecting duct. Aquaporins are membrane proteins that selectively conduct water molecules while preventing the passage of ions and other solutes. As much as three-quarters of the water from urine can be reabsorbed as it leaves the collecting duct by osmosis. Thus the levels of ADH determine whether urine will be concentrated or diluted. An increase in ADH is an indication of dehydration, while water sufficiency results in a decrease in ADH allowing for diluted urine.

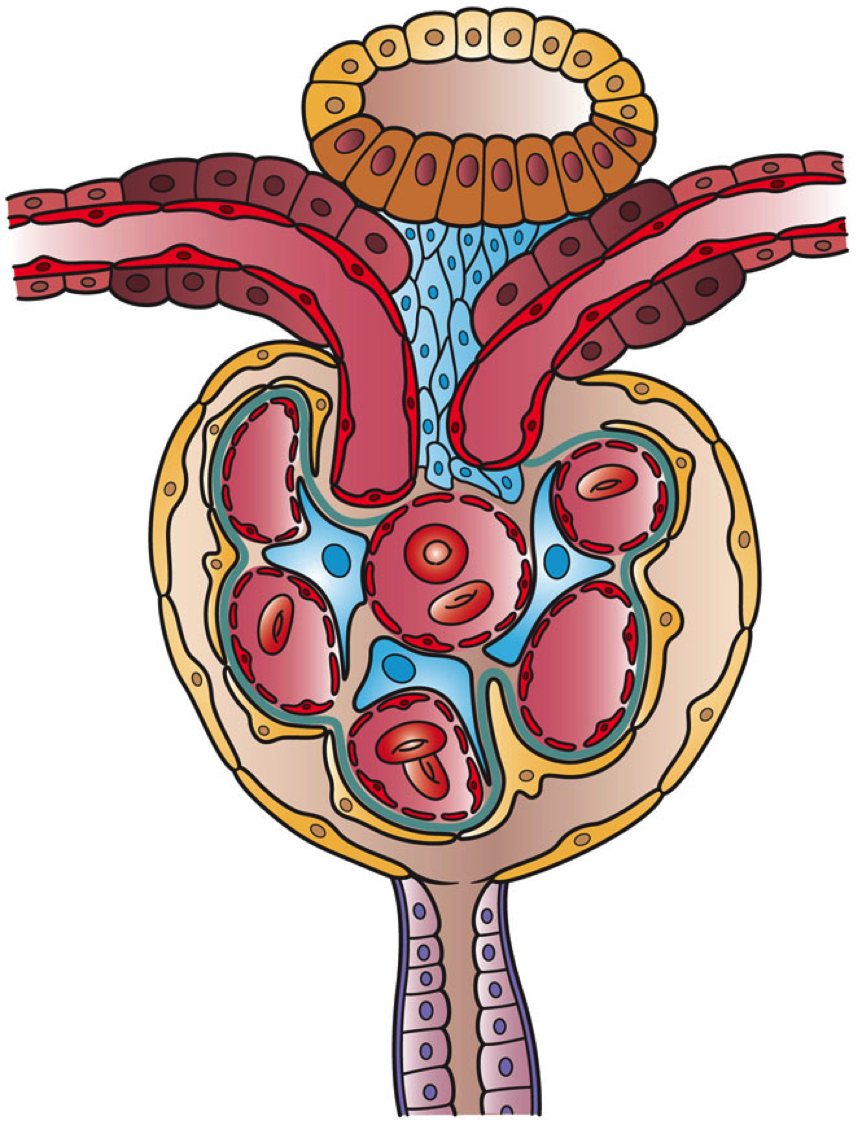
Fig.7) Cross-sectional diagram of the juxtaglomerular apparatus and adjacent structures: 1) top, yellow - distal convoluted tubule; 2) top, brown -macula densa cuboidal cells surrounding arterioles; 3) small blue cells - juxtaglomerular cells; 4) large blue cells - mesangial cells; 5) tan - podocytes lining Bowman's capsule adjacent to capillaries, and parietal layer of capsule, 6)center - five glomerular capillaries, and the 6)bottom, purple - exiting tubule. Structures (2), (3), and (4) constitute the juxtaglomerular apparatus.

Lower portions of the collecting organ are also permeable to urea, allowing some of it to enter the medulla, thus maintaining its high concentration (which is very important for the nephron).

Urine leaves the medullary collecting ducts through the renal papillae, emptying into the renal calyces, the renal pelvis, and finally into the urinary bladder via the ureter.

=== Juxtaglomerular apparatus ===
The juxtaglomerular apparatus (JGA) is a specialized region associated with the nephron, but separate from it. It produces and secretes into the circulation the enzyme renin (angiotensinogenase), which cleaves angiotensinogen and results in the ten amino acid substance angiotensin-1 (A-1). A-1 is then converted to angiotensin-2, a potent vasoconstrictor, by removing two amino acids: this is accomplished by angiotensin converting enzyme (ACE). This sequence of events is referred to as the renin–angiotensin system (RAS) or renin-angiotensin-aldosterone system (RAAS). The JGA is located between the thick ascending limb and the afferent arteriole. It contains three components: the macula densa, juxtaglomerular cells, and extraglomerular mesangial cells.

== Clinical significance ==
Patients in early stages of chronic kidney disease show an approximate 50% reduction in the number of nephrons, comparable to the nephron loss that occurs with aging (between ages 18–29 and 70–75).

Diseases of the nephron predominantly affect either the glomeruli or the tubules. Glomerular diseases include diabetic nephropathy, glomerulonephritis and IgA nephropathy; renal tubular diseases include acute tubular necrosis, renal tubular acidosis, and polycystic kidney disease.

== Additional images ==
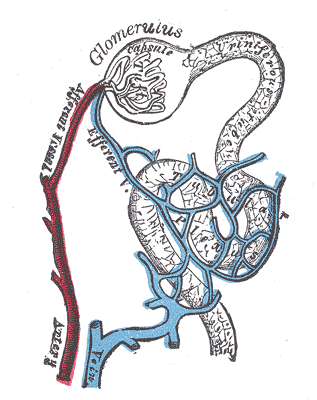
Distribution of blood vessels in cortex of kidney. (Although the figure labels the efferent vessel as a vein, it is actually an arteriole.)

Glomerulus is red; Bowman's capsule is white.

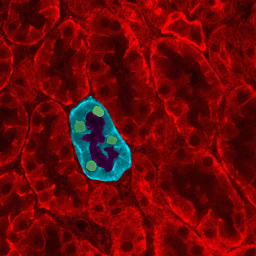
Kidney tissue

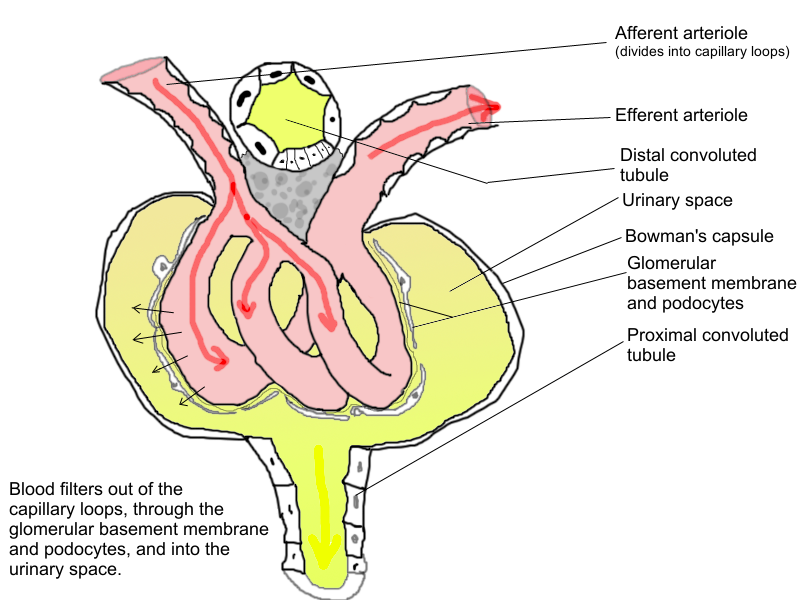
Glomerulus

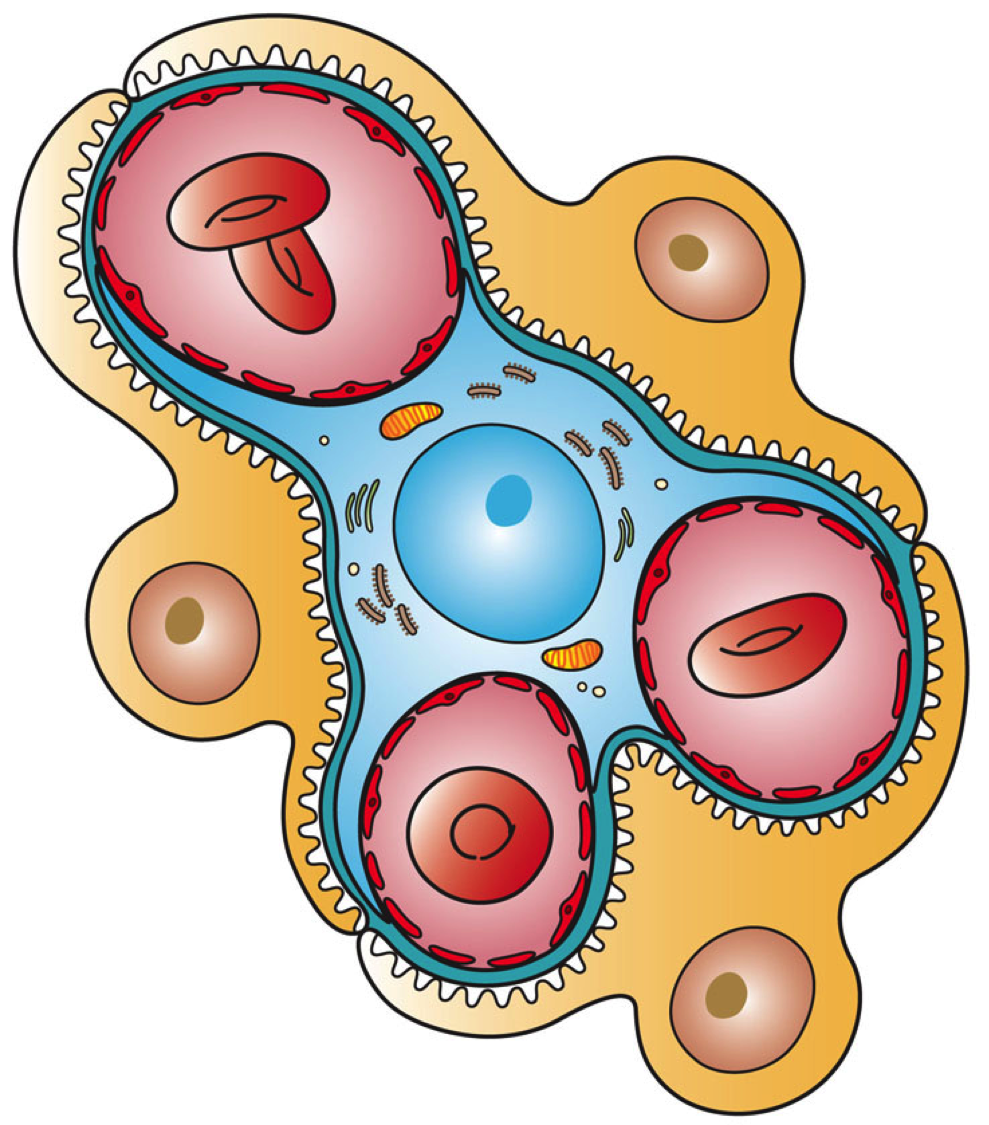
This image shows the types of cells present in the glomerulus part of a kidney nephron. Podocytes, Endothelial cells, and Glomerular mesangial cell are present.

== See also ==
- Nephrology
- Urology
