= Mir-720 microRNA precursor family =

Short RNA molecule

In molecular biology, mir-720 microRNA is a short RNA molecule. MicroRNAs function to regulate the expression levels of other genes by several mechanisms.

== Congenital neural tube defects ==
miR-720 expression has been found to vary in the serum levels of women carrying fetuses with and without neural tube defects. miR-720 is significantly downregulated following child delivery, thus suggesting a role in pregnancy as well as a possible placental derivation.

== Upregulation ==
miR-720 is upregulated in myelodysplastic syndromes, in molar tooth germ in newborn mice following anti-miR-214 injection and in mesangial cells (specialised smooth muscle cells in the kidneys) treated with microRNA inhibitor.

== Targeting ==
miR-720 was shown to target the pluripotency factor Nanog and to upregulate DNMTs. miR-720 controlled stem cell phenotype, proliferation, and differentiation of human dental pulp cells. Dental pulp includes mesenchymal (stem) cells, blood vessels, blood and peripheral nerves. Repression of the pluripotency factor Nanog and upregulation of DNMTs in dental pulp cells by miR-720 initiated odontoblastic differentiation. Therefore, it was suggested that odontoblastic differentiation of dental pulp stem cells required miR-720 that repressed Nanog and induced Dnmt3a and Dnmt3b.

== See also ==
- MicroRNA
