= Metanephrogenic blastema =

Embryological structure involved in the formation of the kidneys

Details
- Carnegie stage: 14
- Days: 35
- Precursor: Wolffian duct
- Gives rise to: Nephron (Bowman's capsule, connecting tubule, distal convoluted tubule, glomerulus, loop of Henle, proximal convoluted tubule), but not collecting duct

Identifiers
- Latin: blastema metanephrogenicum
- TE: blastema_by_E5.6.3.2.0.0.1 E5.6.3.2.0.0.1

The metanephrogenic blastema or metanephric blastema (or metanephric mesenchyme, or metanephric mesoderm) is one of the two embryological structures that give rise to the kidney, the other being the ureteric bud.

The metanephric blastema mostly develops into nephrons, but can also form parts of the collecting duct system.

The system of tissue induction between the ureteric bud and the metanephric blastema is a reciprocal control system. GDNF, glial cell-derived neurotrophic factor, is produced by the metanephric blastema and is essential in binding to the RET receptor on the ureteric bud, which bifurcates and coalesces as a result to form the renal pelvis, major and minor calyces and collecting ducts. Mutations in the EYA1 gene, whose product regulates GDNF expression in the developing kidney, lead to the renal abnormalities of BOR syndrome (branchio-oto-renal syndrome).

== See also ==
- Mesenchyme
- Metanephros
- Blastema
- Kidney development
