= Renal corpuscle =

Blood-filtering component of the nephron of the kidney

- The structure of the renal corpuscle.

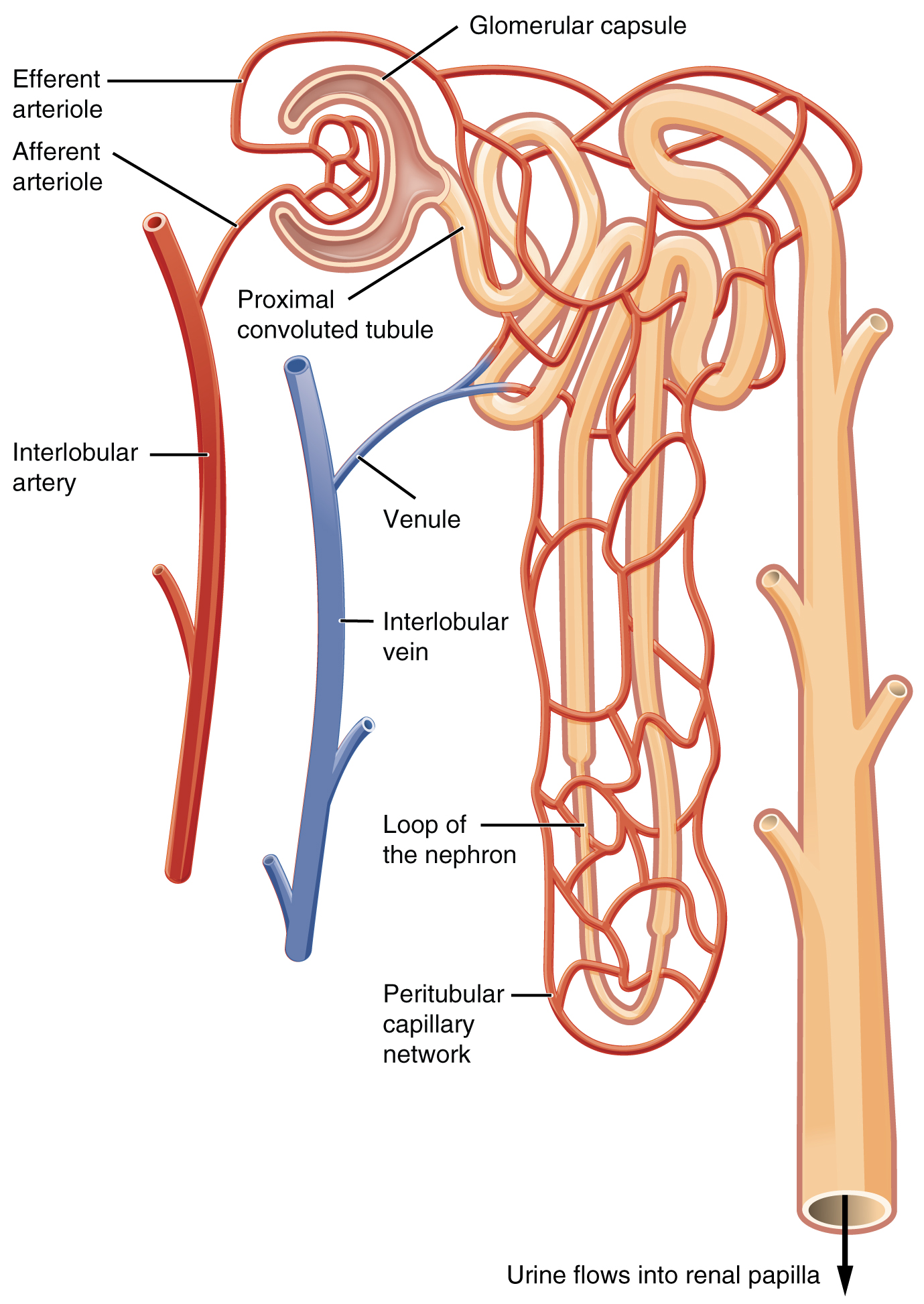
- Diagram of the circulation related to a single glomerulus, associated tubule, and collecting system The renal corpuscle in the cortex (outer layer) of the kidney. At the top, the renal corpuscle containing the glomerulus. The filtered blood exits into the renal tubule as filtrate, at right. At left, blood flows from the afferent arteriole (red), enters into the renal corpuscle and is filtered in the glomerulus; blood flows out of the efferent arteriole (blue).

Details
- Location: Nephron of the kidney

Identifiers
- Latin: corpusculum renis
- FMA: 15625

A renal corpuscle (or Malpighian body) is the blood-filtering component of the nephron of the kidney. It consists of a glomerulus - a tuft of capillaries composed of endothelial cells - and a glomerular capsule known as Bowman's capsule.

== Structure ==
The renal corpuscle is composed of two structures, the glomerulus and the Bowman's capsule. The glomerulus is a small tuft of capillaries containing two cell types. Endothelial cells, which have large fenestrae, are not covered by diaphragms. Mesangial cells are modified smooth muscle cells that lie between the capillaries. They regulate blood flow by their contractile activity and secrete extracellular matrix, prostaglandins, and cytokines. Mesangial cells also have phagocytic activity, removing proteins and other molecules trapped in the glomerular basement membrane or filtration barrier.

The Bowman's capsule has an outer parietal layer composed of simple squamous epithelium. The visceral layer, composed of modified simple squamous epithelium, is lined by podocytes, podocyte foot processes (pedicels), that wrap around glomerular capillaries. These pedicels interdigitate with pedicels of adjacent podocytes forming filtration slits.

There are two poles in the renal corpuscle, a vascular pole and a tubular pole. The vascular pole is a location of the glomerulus. At the vascular pole, the afferent arterioles and efferent arterioles enter and leave the glomerulus in the Bowman's capsule. The tubular pole is at the other end opposite to the vascular pole. At the tubular pole, the proximal convoluted tubule arises.

== Function ==
The renal corpuscle acts to filter blood. Fluid from blood in the glomerulus is collected in the Bowman's capsule to form "glomerular filtrate", which is then further processed along the nephron to form urine. It does this via a filtration barrier. The renal corpuscle filtration barrier is composed of: the fenestrated endothelium of glomerular capillaries, the fused basal lamina of endothelial cells and podocytes, and the filtration slits of the podocytes. This barrier permits passage of water, ions, and small molecules from the bloodstream into Bowman's space (the space between the visceral and parietal layers). Large and/or negatively charged proteins are prevented from passing into Bowman's space, thus retaining these proteins in the circulation. The basal lamina is composed of 3 layers: lamina rara externa, lamina densa, and lamina rara interna. The lamina rara externa is adjacent to the podocyte processes. The lamina densa is the central layer consisting of type IV collagen and laminin. This layer acts as a selective macromolecular filter, preventing the passage of large protein molecules into Bowman's space. The lamina rara interna is adjacent to endothelial cells. This layer contains heparan sulfate, a negatively charged glycosaminoglycan that contributes to the electrostatic barrier of the glomerular filter.

== Eponym ==
A renal corpuscle is also known as a Malpighian corpuscle, named after Marcello Malpighi (1628–1694), an Italian physician and biologist. This name is no longer widely used, probably to avoid confusion with a Malpighian corpuscle in the spleen.

== Additional images ==
Image showing the main components of the renal corpusle. Glomerulus is red; Bowman's capsule is pink.

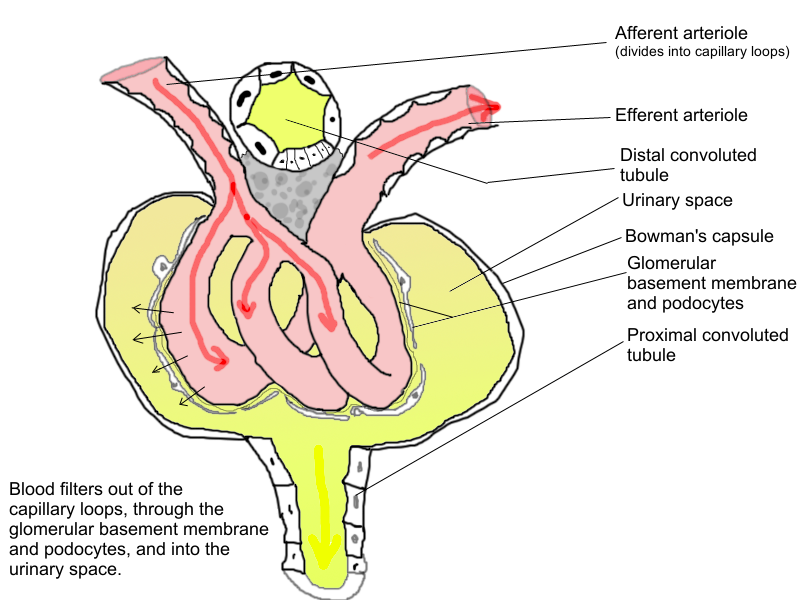
Outline of function of renal corpuscle
