= Tubular fluid =

Fluid in the tubules of the kidney

Tubular fluid is the fluid in the tubules of the kidney. It starts as a renal ultrafiltrate in the glomerulus, changes composition through the nephron, and ends up as urine leaving through the ureters.

== Composition table ==
The composition of tubular fluid changes throughout the nephron, from the proximal tubule to the collecting duct and then as it exits the body, from the ureter.

Concentration (mM) of substances in different segments of nephron and collecting duct system
Substance	proximal tubule			loop of Henle			Distal convoluted tubule	Collecting duct system			
Substance	S1	S2	S3	descending limb	thin ascending limb	thick ascending limb	Distal convoluted tubule	connecting tubule	initial collecting tubule	cortical collecting ducts	medullary collecting ducts
Na^{+}	142		142			100	70			40	
