= Glomerular basement membrane =

Part of the filtration apparatus of the kidney

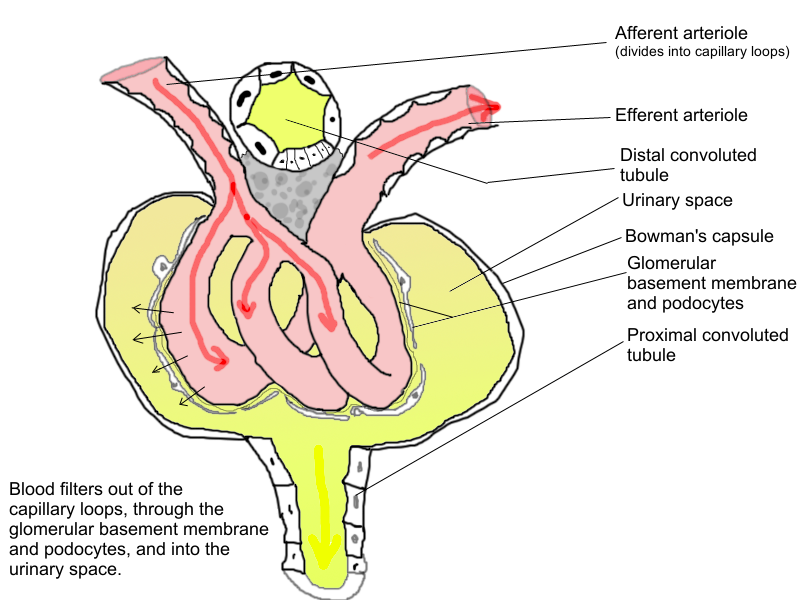
- Glomerulus; note "Glomerular basement membrane and podocytes".

- Scheme of filtration barrier (blood-urine) in the kidney. A. The endothelial cells of the glomerulus; 1. pore (fenestra). B. Glomerular basement membrane: 1. lamina rara interna 2. lamina densa 3. lamina rara externa C. Podocytes: 1. enzymatic and structural protein 2. filtration slit 3. diaphragm

Identifiers
- MeSH: D050533
- FMA: 74274

The glomerular basement membrane of the kidney is the particular basement membrane of the glomerulus. The glomerular endothelial cells, the glomerular basement membrane, and the filtration slits between the podocytes perform the filtration function of the glomerulus, separating the blood in the capillaries from the filtrate that forms in Bowman's capsule. The glomerular basement membrane is a fusion of the endothelial cell and podocyte basal laminas, and is the main site of restriction of water flow. Glomerular basement membrane is secreted and maintained by podocyte cells.

== Layers ==
The glomerular basement membrane contains three layers:

Layer	Location	Composition	Function
lamina rara externa	adjacent to podocyte processes	heparan sulfate Sialoglycoproteins proteoglycans	Heparan sulfate restricts movement of anionic particles. Sialoglycoproteins glue cells on the GBM.
lamina densa	dark central zone	type 4 collagen and laminin	blocks by size (Molecular Weight > 70kDa)
lamina rara interna	adjacent to endothelial cells	heparan sulfate Chondroitin sulphate	blocks by charge

The glomerular membrane consists of mesangial cells, modified pericytes that in other parts of the body separate capillaries from each other. The podocytes adjoining them have filtration slits of diameter 25 nm that are formed by the pseudopodia arising from them. The filtration slits are covered by a diaphragm that includes the transmembrane protein nephrin.

== Pathology ==
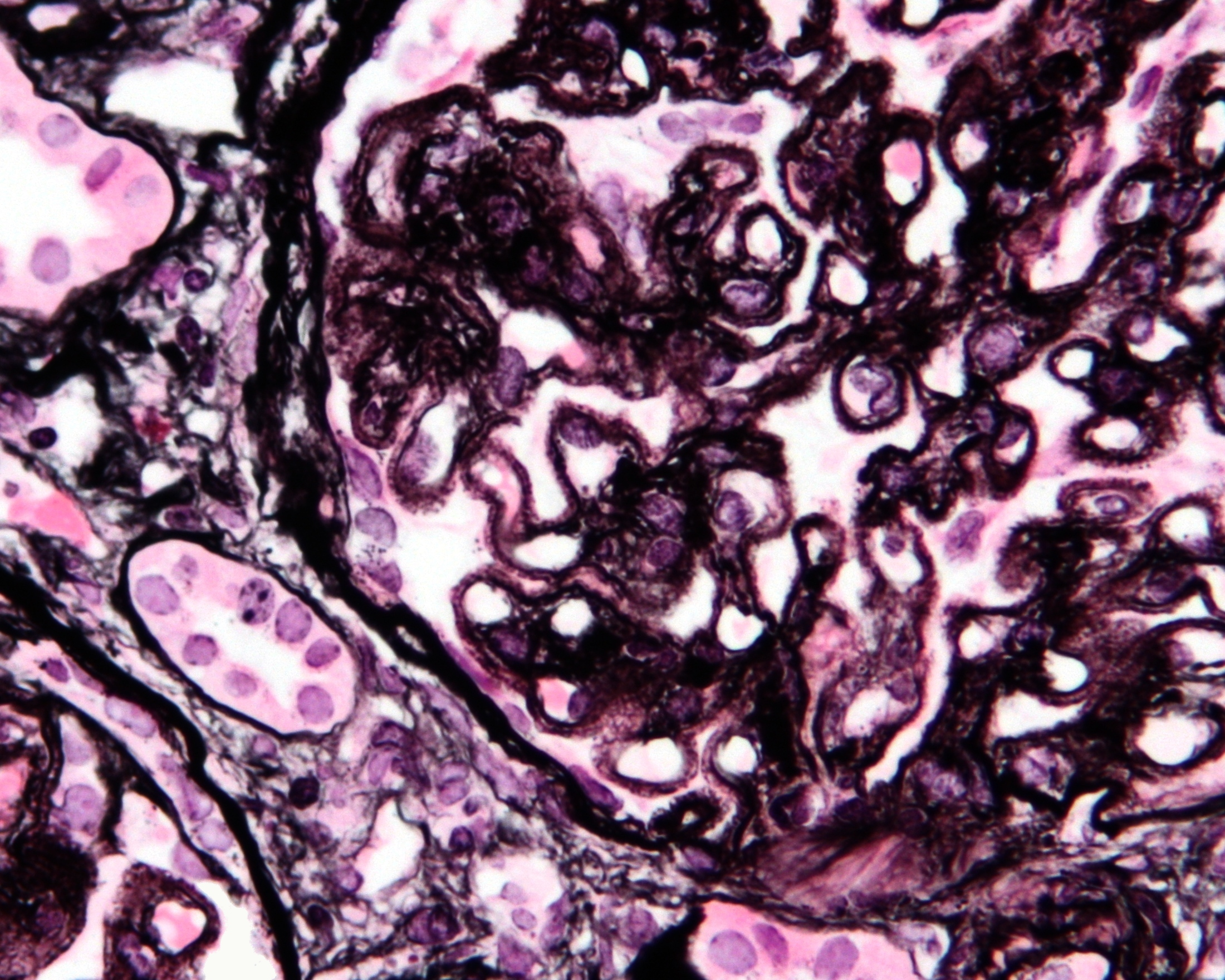
Micrograph showing glomular basement membrane spike formation in membranous nephropathy. Jones stain.

- Goodpasture's syndrome is also known as anti-glomerular basement membrane disease. Capillaries become inflamed as a result of damage to the basement membrane by antibodies to alpha 3 NC1 domain of type IV collagen.
- Nephrotic syndrome is a change in the structure of the glomerular filtration mechanism usually in the glomerular basement membrane. Some symptoms include proteinuria, hypoalbuminaemia, oedema, and hyperlipidemia.
- Diabetic glomerulosclerosis is a thickening of the basement membrane, which can become up to 4-5 times thicker than normal. Can be caused by insulin deficiency or resultant hyperglycemia.
- Alport syndrome is a X-linked hereditary nephritis caused by mutations in type IV collagen, leading to a split lamina densa of the glomerular basement membrane. It also affects the eye and inner ear.

== See also ==
- Agrin, a protein linked to heparan sulfate
- basement membrane
- nephrin

== Additional images ==
Renal corpuscle (glomerulus) showing glomular basement membrane.
