= Podocyte =

Type of kidney cell

- The podocytes shown in cyan, line Bowman's capsule in the renal corpuscle and wrap around the capillaries as a major part of the filtration process in the kidneys

Details
- Precursor: Intermediate mesoderm
- Location: Bowman's capsule of the kidney

Identifiers
- Latin: podocytus
- MeSH: D050199
- FMA: 70967

Podocytes are cells in Bowman's capsule in the kidneys that wrap around capillaries of the glomerulus. Podocytes make up the epithelial lining of Bowman's capsule, the third layer through which filtration of blood takes place. Bowman's capsule filters the blood, retaining large molecules such as proteins while smaller molecules such as water, salts, and sugars are filtered as the first step in the formation of urine. Although various viscera have epithelial layers, the name visceral epithelial cells usually refers specifically to podocytes, which are specialized epithelial cells that reside in the visceral layer of the capsule.

The podocytes have long primary processes called trabeculae that form secondary processes known as pedicels or foot processes (for which the cells are named podo- + -cyte). The pedicels wrap around the capillaries and leave slits between them. Blood is filtered through these slits, each known as a filtration slit, slit diaphragm, or slit pore. Several proteins are required for the pedicels to wrap around the capillaries and function. When infants are born with certain defects in these proteins, such as nephrin and CD2AP, their kidneys cannot function. People have variations in these proteins, and some variations may predispose them to kidney failure later in life. Nephrin is a zipper-like protein that forms the slit diaphragm, with spaces between the teeth of the zipper big enough to allow sugar and water through but too small to allow proteins through. Nephrin defects are responsible for congenital kidney failure. CD2AP regulates the podocyte cytoskeleton and stabilizes the slit diaphragm.

== Structure ==
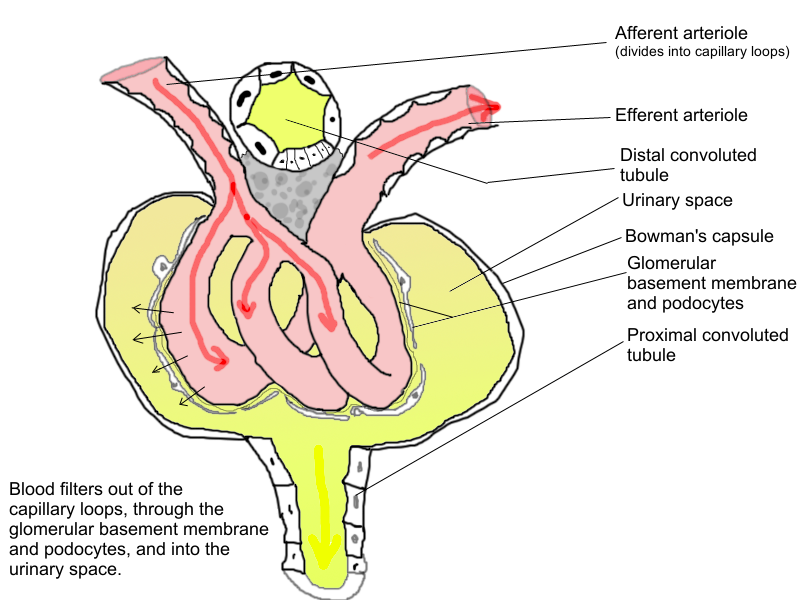
Illustration of Bowman's capsule, and glomerular capillaries wrapped by podocytes

A podocyte has a complex structure. Its cell body has extending major or primary processes that form secondary processes as podocyte foot processes or pedicels. The primary processes are held by microtubules and intermediate filaments. The foot processes have an actin-based cytoskeleton. Podocytes are found lining the Bowman's capsules in the nephrons of the kidney. The pedicels or foot processes wrap around the glomerular capillaries to form the filtration slits. The pedicels increase the surface area of the cells enabling efficient ultrafiltration.

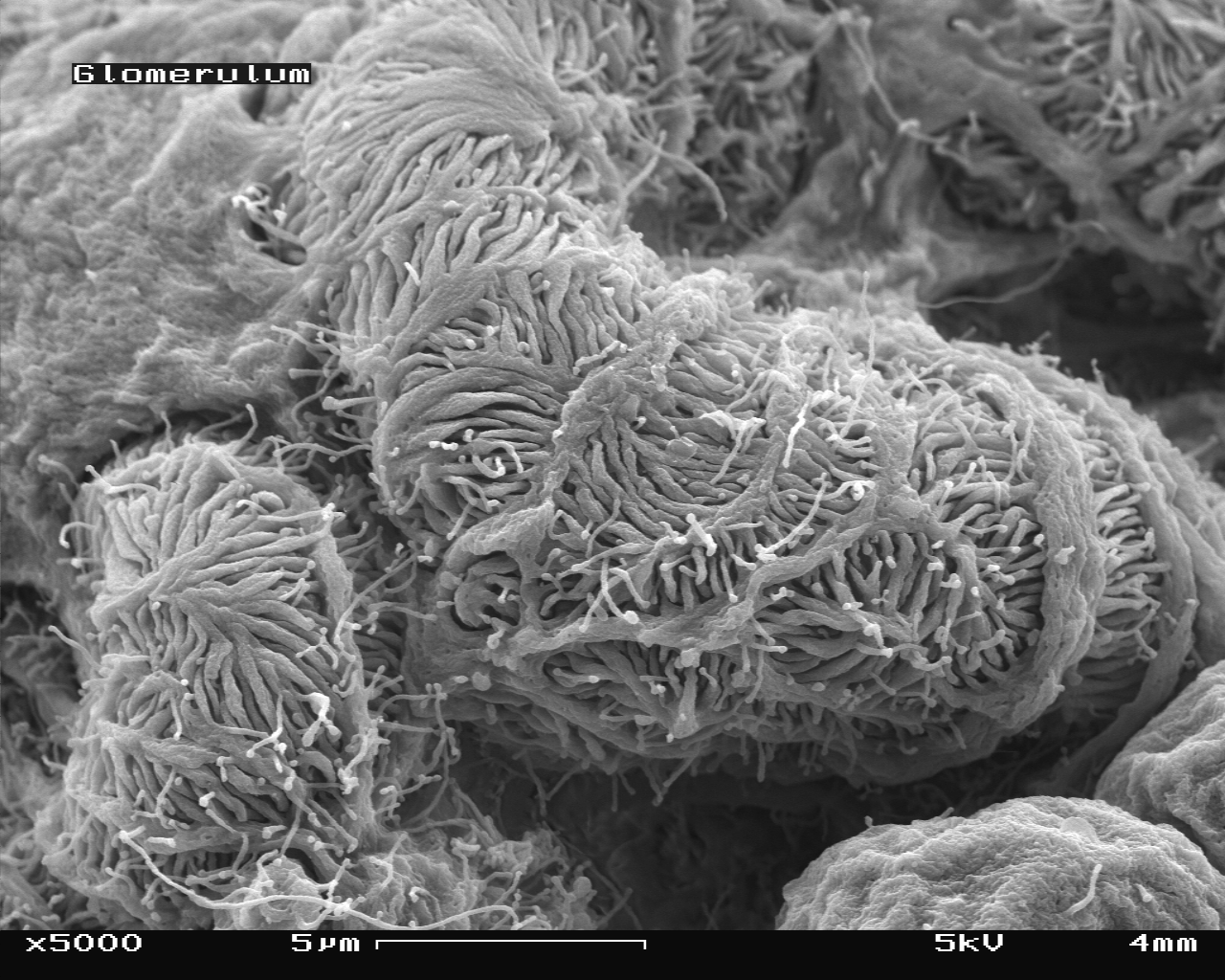
Pedicels of podocytes interdigitating to create numerous filtration slits around glomerular capillaries in 5000x electron micrograph

Podocytes secrete and maintain the basement membrane.

There are numerous coated vesicles and coated pits along the basolateral domain of the podocytes which indicate a high rate of vesicular traffic.

Podocytes possess a well-developed endoplasmic reticulum and a large Golgi apparatus, indicative of a high capacity for protein synthesis and post-translational modifications.

There is also growing evidence of a large number of multivesicular bodies and other lysosomal components seen in these cells, indicating a high endocytic activity.

=== Energy needs ===
Podocytes require a significant amount of energy to preserve the structural integrity of their foot processes, given the substantial mechanical stress they endure during the glomerular filtration process.

Dynamic changes in glomerular capillary pressure exert both tensile and stretching forces on podocyte foot processes, and can lead to mechanical strain on their cytoskeleton. Concurrently, fluid flow shear stress is generated by the movement of glomerular ultrafiltrate, exerting a tangential force on the surface of these foot processes.

In order to preserve their intricate foot process architecture, podocytes require a substantial ATP expenditure to maintain their structure and cytoskeletal organization, counteract the elevated glomerular capillary pressure and stabilize the capillary wall.

== Function ==
Scheme of filtration barrier (blood-urine) in the kidney. A. The endothelial cells of the glomerulus; 1. pore (fenestra). B. Glomerular basement membrane: 1. lamina rara interna 2. lamina densa 3. lamina rara externa C. Podocytes: 1. enzymatic and structural protein 2. filtration slit 3. diaphragma

Podocytes have primary processes called trabeculae, which wrap around the glomerular capillaries. The trabeculae in turn have secondary processes called pedicels or foot processes. Pedicels interdigitate, thereby giving rise to thin gaps called filtration slits. The slits are covered by slit diaphragms which are composed of a number of cell-surface proteins including nephrin, podocalyxin, and P-cadherin, which restrict the passage of large macromolecules such as serum albumin and gamma globulin and ensure that they remain in the bloodstream. Proteins that are required for the correct function of the slit diaphragm include nephrin, NEPH1, NEPH2, podocin, CD2AP. and FAT1.

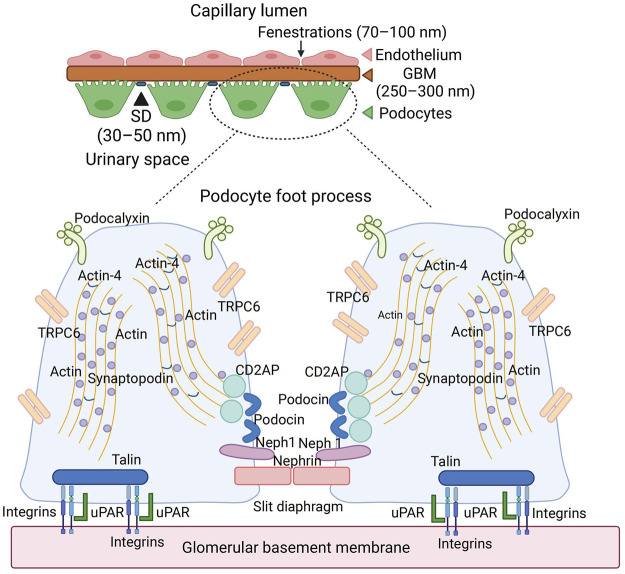
The protein composition of podocytes and the slit diaphragm.

Small molecules such as water, glucose, and ionic salts are able to pass through the filtration slits and form an ultrafiltrate in the tubular fluid, which is further processed by the nephron to produce urine.

Podocytes are also involved in regulation of glomerular filtration rate (GFR). When podocytes contract, they cause closure of filtration slits. This decreases the GFR by reducing the surface area available for filtration.

== Clinical significance ==
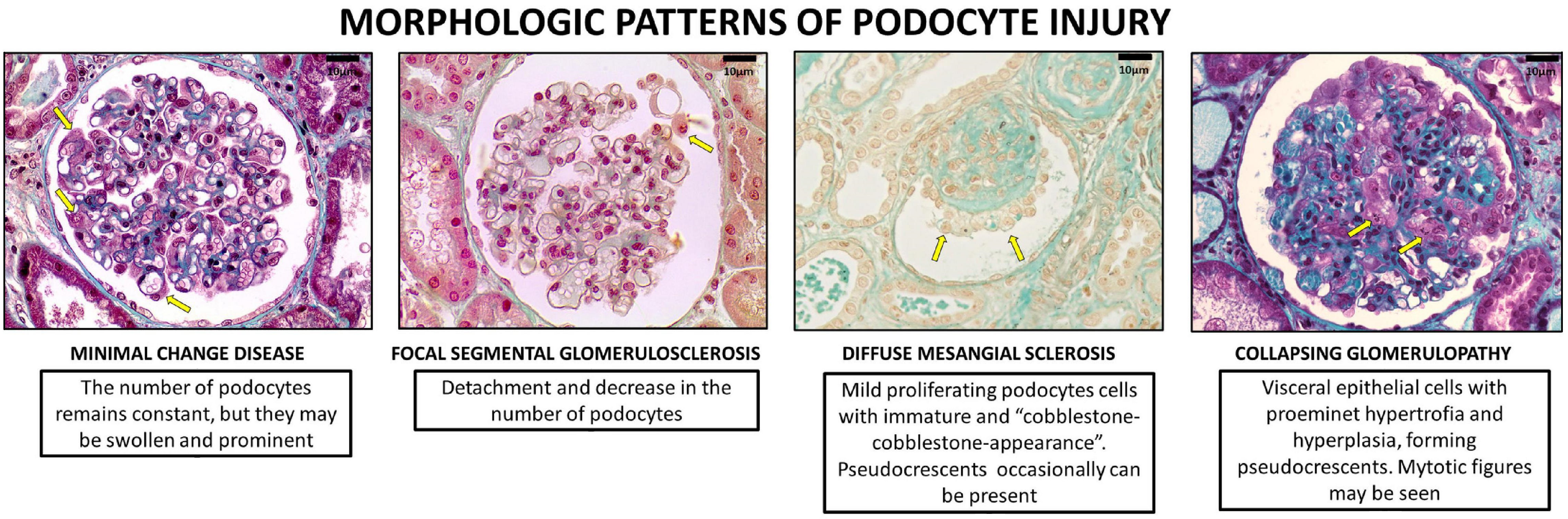
Morphologic patterns of podocyte injury.

A loss of the foot processes of the podocytes (i.e., podocyte effacement) is a hallmark of minimal change disease, which has therefore sometimes been called foot process disease.

Disruption of the filtration slits or destruction of the podocytes can lead to massive proteinuria, where large amounts of protein are lost from the blood.

An example of this occurs in the congenital disorder Finnish-type nephrosis, which is characterised by neonatal proteinuria leading to end-stage kidney failure. This disease has been found to be caused by a mutation in the nephrin gene.

In 2002 Professor Moin Saleem at the University of Bristol made the first conditionally immortalised human podocyte cell line. This meant that podocytes could be grown and studied in the lab. Since then many discoveries have been made. Nephrotic syndrome occurs when there is a breakdown of the glomerular filtration barrier. The podocytes form one layer of the filtration barrier. Genetic mutations can cause podocyte dysfunction leading to an inability of the filtration barrier to restrict urinary protein loss. There are currently 53 genes known to play a role in genetic nephrotic syndrome. In idiopathic nephrotic syndrome, there is no known genetic mutation. It is thought to be caused by a hitherto unknown circulating permeability factor. Recent evidence suggests that the factor could be released by T-cells or B-cells, podocyte cell lines can be treated with plasma from patients with nephrotic syndrome to understand the specific responses of the podocyte to the circulating factor. There is growing evidence that the circulating factor could be signalling to the podocyte via the PAR-1 receptor.

Presence of podocytes in urine has been proposed as an early diagnostic marker for preeclampsia.

== See also ==
- List of human cell types derived from the germ layers
- List of distinct cell types in the adult human body
