= Bowman's capsule =

Kidney structure which performs the first step in blood filtration

Glomerular capsule (Bowman's capsule)
- Glomerulus (red), Glomerular capsule (blue) and proximal tubule (green)

Details
- Precursor: Metanephric blastema
- Location: Nephron of kidney

Identifiers
- Latin: capsula glomeruli
- MeSH: D050476
- FMA: 15626

The glomerular capsule (or the Bowman capsule, capsula glomeruli, or Bowman's capsule) is a cup-like sac at the beginning of the tubular component of a nephron in the mammalian kidney that performs the first step in the filtration of blood to form urine. A glomerulus is enclosed in the sac. Fluids from blood in the glomerulus are collected in the glomerular capsule.

== Structure ==
Outside the capsule, there are two poles:

- The vascular pole is the side with the afferent arteriole and efferent arteriole.
- The tubular pole, is the side with the proximal convoluted tubule.

Inside the capsule, the layers are as follows, from outside to inside:

- Parietal layer—A single layer of simple squamous epithelium. Does not function in filtration.
- Bowman's space (or "urinary space", or "capsular space")—Between the visceral and parietal layers, into which the filtrate enters after passing through the filtration slits.
- Visceral layer—Lies just above the thickened glomerular basement membrane and is made of podocytes. Beneath the visceral layer lie the glomerular capillaries.
- Filtration barrier—The filtration barrier is composed of the fenestrated endothelium of the glomerular capillaries, the fused basal lamina of the endothelial cells and podocytes, and the filtration slits of the podocytes. The barrier permits the passage of water, ions, and small molecules from the bloodstream into the Bowman's space. The barrier prevents the passage of large and/or negatively charged proteins (such as albumin). The basal lamina of the filtration barrier is composed of three layers. The first layer is the lamina rara externa, adjacent to the podocyte processes. The second layer is the lamina rara interna, adjacent to the endothelial cells. The final layer is the lamina densa which is a darker central zone of the basal lamina. It consists of the meshwork of type IV collagen and laminin which act as a selective macromolecular filter.

== Function ==
Diagram showing Bowman's capsule as part of the renal corpuscle

The process of filtration of the blood in the glomerular capsule is ultrafiltration, and the normal rate of filtration is 125 ml/min, equivalent to 80 times the daily blood volume. It is a major site for blood filtration (including glomerulus)

Any proteins under roughly 30 kilodaltons can pass freely through the membrane, although there is some extra hindrance for negatively charged molecules due to the negative charge of the basement membrane and the podocytes.

Any small molecules such as water, glucose, salt (NaCl), amino acids, and urea pass freely into Bowman's space, but cells, platelets and large proteins do not.

As a result, the filtrate leaving the glomerular capsule is very similar to blood plasma (filtrate or glomerular filtrate is composed of blood plasma minus plasma protein i.e. it contains all the components of blood plasma except the proteins) in composition as it passes into the proximal convoluted tubule.

== Clinical significance ==
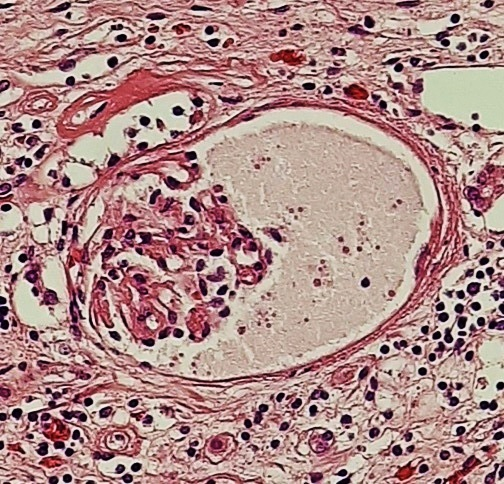
Micrograph of proteinaceous material in Bowman's space, which is unspecific. It is present in about 5% of people aged over 60 years, but also in for example hypertensive kidney disease.

Measuring the glomerular filtration rate (GFR) is a diagnostic test of kidney function. A decreased GFR may be a sign of kidney failure.

A number of diseases can result in various problems within the glomerulus. Examples include acute proliferative (endocapillary) glomerulonephritis, mesangioproliferative glomerulonephritis, mesangiocapillary (membranoproliferative) glomerulonephritis, acute crescentic glomerulonephritis, focal segmental glomerulonephritis, and diabetic glomerulosclerosis.

== History ==
Bowman's capsule is named after Sir William Bowman (1816–1892), a British surgeon and anatomist. However, thorough microscopical anatomy of kidney including the nephronic capsule was first described by a Ukrainian surgeon and anatomist from the Russian Empire, Prof. Alexander Schumlansky (1748–1795), in his 1782 doctoral thesis "De structura renum" ("About Kidney Structure", in Latin); thus, much prior to Bowman.

Together with the glomerulus, it is known as a renal corpuscle, or a Malpighian corpuscle, named after Marcello Malpighi (1628–1694), an Italian physician and biologist. This name is not used widely anymore, probably to avoid confusion with Malpighian bodies of the spleen.

== See also ==
- Mesangium
- Blood–brain barrier
- List of distinct cell types in the adult human body

== Additional images ==
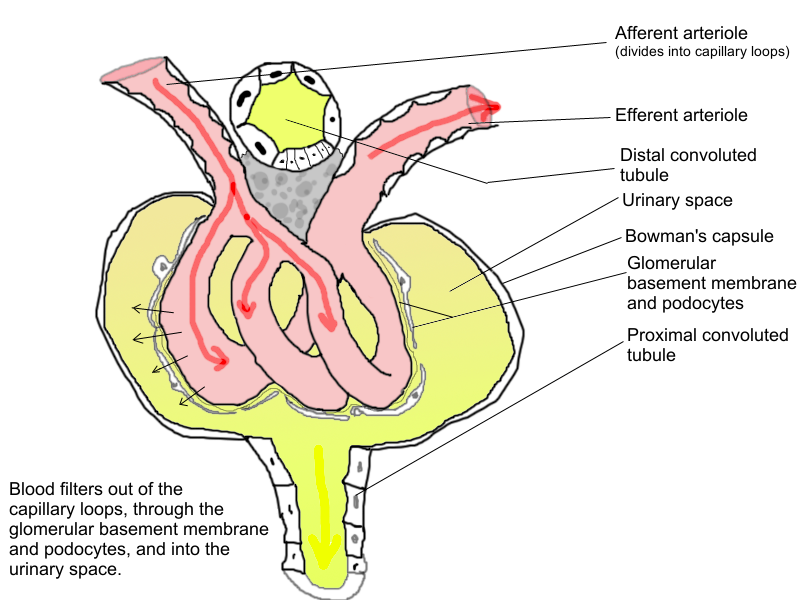
Glomerulus.
