= Glomerulus =

Glomerulus (/ɡləˈmɛr(j)ələs, ɡloʊ-/; pl.: glomeruli) is a common term used in anatomy to describe globular structures of entwined vessels, fibers, or neurons. Glomerulus is the diminutive of the Latin glomus, meaning "ball of yarn".

Glomerulus may refer to:

- Glomerulus (kidney), the filtering unit of the kidney
- Glomerulus (olfaction), a structure in the olfactory bulb
- Glomerulus (cerebellum), the contact between specific cells in the cerebellum

== See also ==
- Glomerulation, a hemorrhage of the bladder
