= Glomerulus (kidney) =

Functional unit of nephron

- Glomerulus (red), Bowman's capsule (blue) and proximal tubule (green)

Details
- Pronunciation: /ɡləˈmɛr(j)ələs, ɡloʊ-/
- Precursor: Metanephric blastema
- Location: Nephron of kidney

Identifiers
- Latin: glomerulus renalis
- MeSH: D007678
- FMA: 15624

The glomerulus is a key part of the kidney, aiding in the filtration of waste materials

The glomerulus (pl.: glomeruli) or glomerulum (pl.: glomerula) is a network of small blood vessels (capillaries) known as a tuft, located at the beginning of a nephron in the kidney. Each of the two kidneys contains about one million nephrons. The tuft is structurally supported by the mesangium (the space between the blood vessels), composed of intraglomerular mesangial cells. The blood is filtered across the capillary walls of this tuft through the glomerular filtration barrier, which yields its filtrate of water and soluble substances to a cup-like sac known as Bowman's capsule. The filtrate then enters the renal tubule of the nephron.

The glomerulus receives its blood supply from an afferent arteriole of the renal arterial circulation. Unlike most capillary beds, the glomerular capillaries exit into efferent arterioles rather than venules. The resistance of the efferent arterioles causes sufficient hydrostatic pressure within the glomerulus to provide the force for ultrafiltration.

The glomerulus and its surrounding Bowman's capsule constitute a renal corpuscle, the basic filtration unit of the kidney. The rate at which blood is filtered through all of the glomeruli, and thus the measure of the overall kidney function, is the glomerular filtration rate.

== Structure ==
Renal corpuscle showing glomerulus and glomerular capillaries

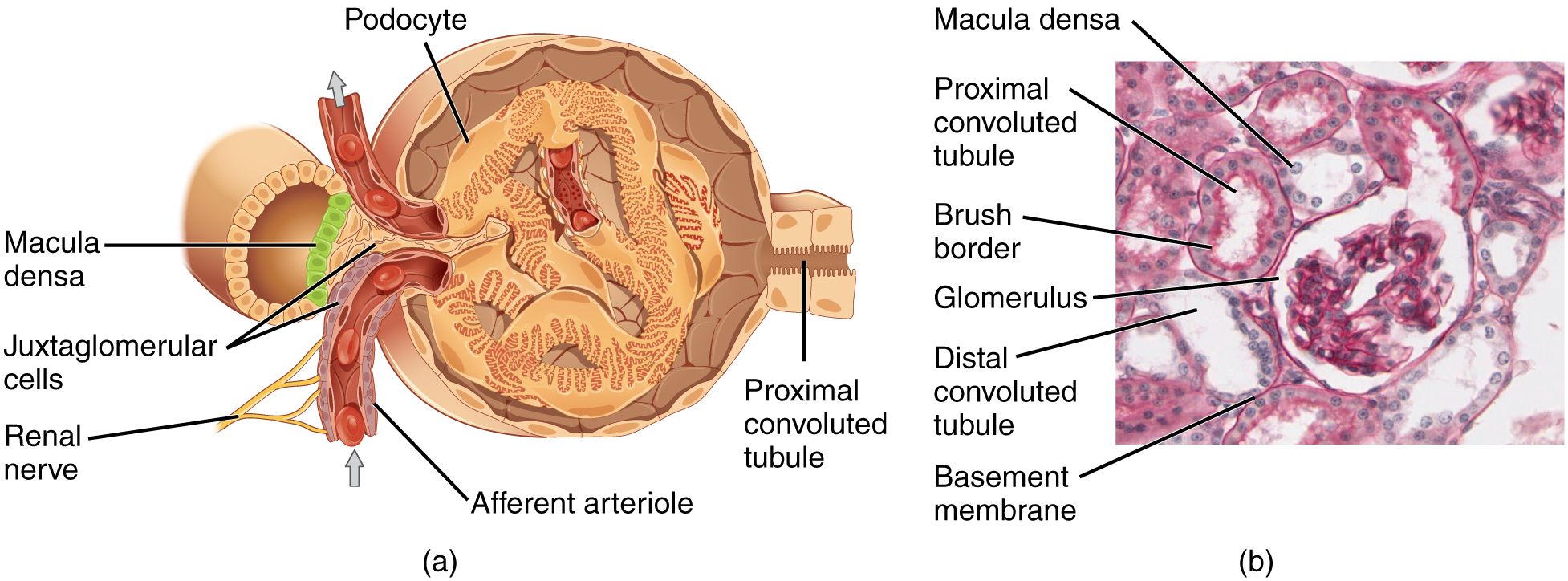
Figure 2: (a) Diagram of the juxtaglomerular apparatus: it has specialized cells working as a unit which monitor the sodiujuxtaglomerular apparatus: it has three types of specm content of the fluid in the distal convoluted tubule (not labelled - it is the tubule on the left) and adjust the glomerular filtration rate and the rate of renin release. (b) Micrograph showing the glomerulus and surrounding structures.

The glomerulus is a tuft of capillaries located within Bowman's capsule within the kidney. Glomerular mesangial cells structurally support the tufts. Blood enters the capillaries of the glomerulus by a single arteriole called an afferent arteriole and leaves by an efferent arteriole. The capillaries consist of a tube lined by endothelial cells with a central lumen. The gaps between these endothelial cells are called fenestrae. The walls have a unique structure: there are pores between the cells that allow water and soluble substances to exit and after passing through the glomerular basement membrane and between digitating podocyte foot processes, enter the capsule as ultrafiltrate.

=== Lining ===
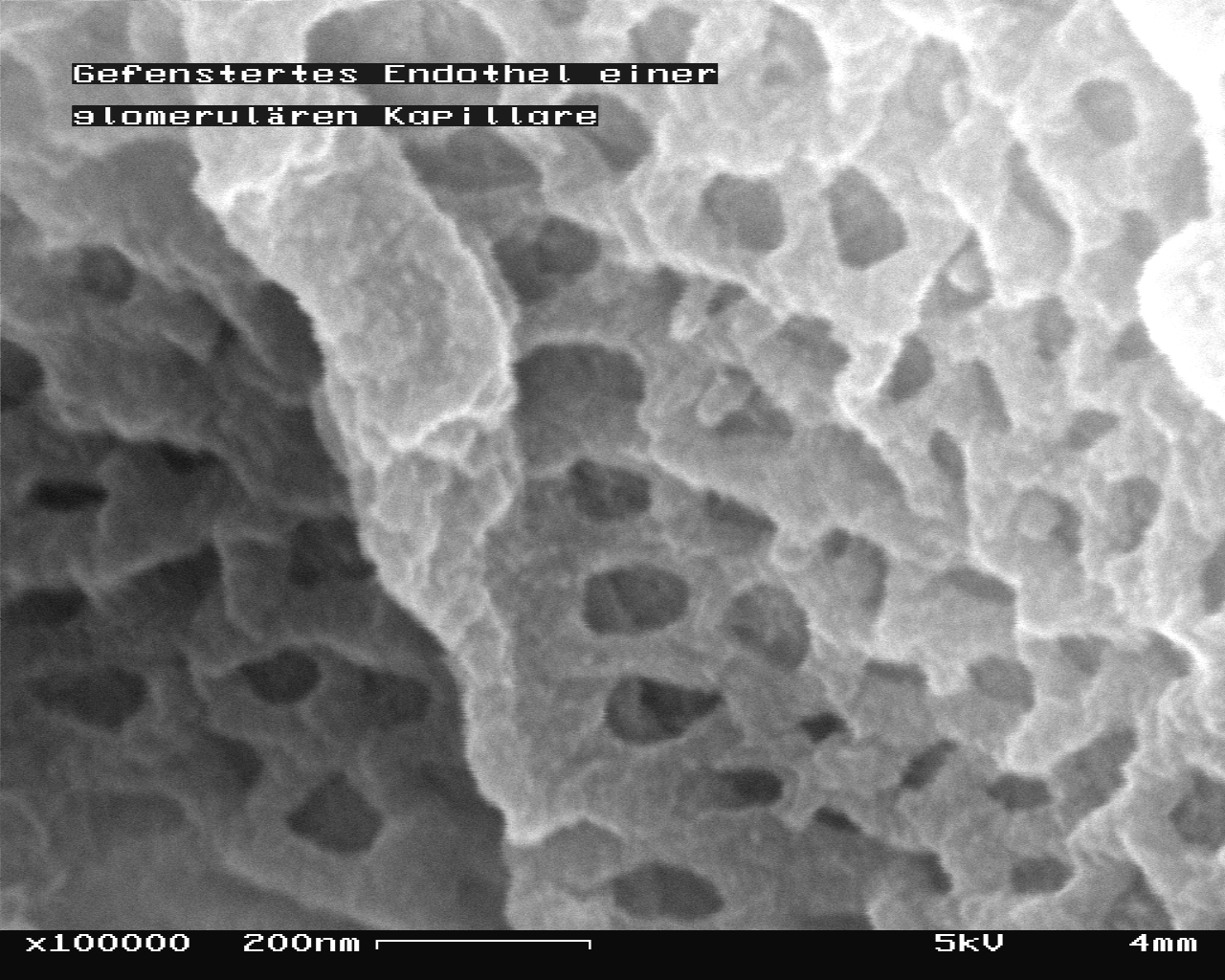
Scanning electron microscope view of the inner surface of an opened (broken) capillary with fenestrae visible (100,000x magnification)

Capillaries of the glomerulus are lined by endothelial cells. These contain numerous pores—also called fenestrae—50–100 nm in diameter. Unlike those of other capillaries with fenestrations, these fenestrations are not spanned by diaphragms. They allow for the filtration of fluid, blood plasma solutes and protein, while at the same time preventing the filtration of red blood cells, white blood cells, and platelets.

The glomerulus has a glomerular basement membrane sandwiched between the glomerular capillaries and the podocytes. It consists mainly of laminins, type IV collagen, agrin, and nidogen, which are synthesized and secreted by both endothelial cells and podocytes. The glomerular basement membrane is 250–400 nm in thickness, which is thicker than basement membranes of other tissue. It is a barrier to blood proteins such as albumin and globulin.

The part of the podocyte in contact with the glomerular basement membrane is called a podocyte foot process or pedicle (Fig. 3): there are gaps between the foot processes through which the filtrate flows into Bowman's capsule. The space between adjacent podocyte foot processes is spanned by slit diaphragms consisting of a mat of proteins, including podocin and nephrin. In addition, foot processes have a negatively charged coat (glycocalyx) that repels negatively charged molecules such as serum albumin.

=== Mesangium ===
The mesangium, or mesangial region, is the central or axial region of the renal glomerulus, forming a stalk-like core from which the glomerular capillary loops arise. Situated between and surrounded by the capillaries, but outside their lumina, the mesangium is continuous with the smooth muscle of the arterioles and is enclosed, together with the capillaries, by the basement membrane.

The term mesangium derives from the Ancient Greek mésos ("middle") and angeîon ("vessel"), referring to its location between the glomerular capillaries. The designation originally arose from the erroneous assumption that the region contained a vascular mesentery analogous to the intestinal mesentery. Although this interpretation was subsequently disproved, the terms mesangium and mesangial region were retained following the identification by electron microscopy of a third glomerular cell type, the mesangial cell, in addition to podocytes and endothelial cells.

The mesangium consists primarily of intraglomerular mesangial cells embedded in an extracellular mesangial matrix, an amorphous, basement membrane-like material secreted by the mesangial cells. Mesangial cells are specialized pericytes that do not constitute part of the glomerular filtration barrier but participate in regulating the glomerular filtration rate through contraction and relaxation, mediated by their intracellular actin and myosin filaments. Some mesangial cells are in direct physical contact with the glomerular capillaries, while others contact the podocytes. Bidirectional chemical communication between the mesangial cells, capillaries and podocytes contributes to the fine regulation of glomerular filtration.

=== Blood supply ===
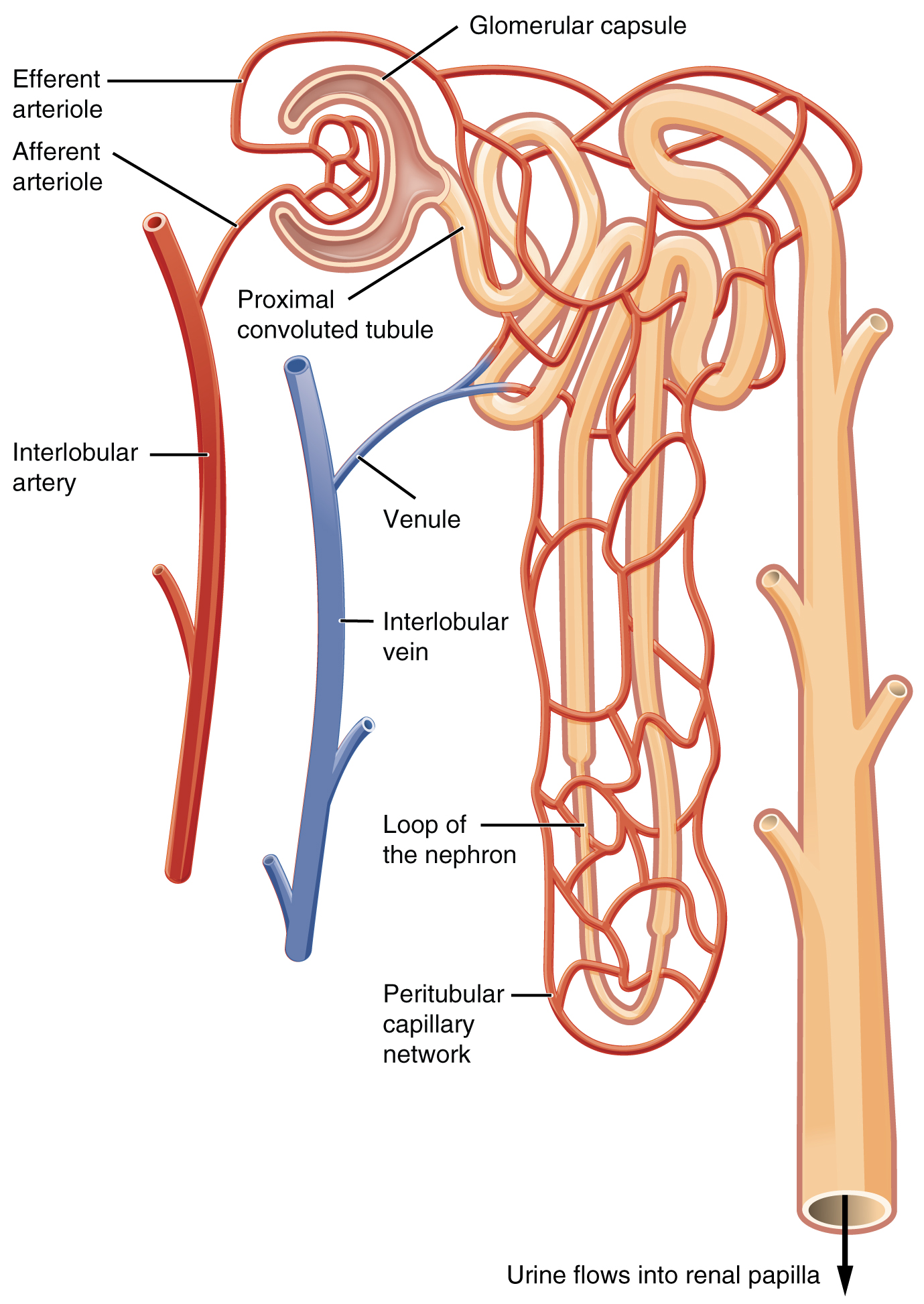
Diagram of the circulation related to a single glomerulus, associated tubule, and collecting system

The glomerulus receives its blood supply from an afferent arteriole of the renal arterial circulation. Unlike most capillary beds, the glomerular capillaries exit into efferent arterioles rather than venules. The resistance of the efferent arterioles causes sufficient hydrostatic pressure within the glomerulus to provide the force for ultrafiltration.

Blood exits the glomerular capillaries by an efferent arteriole instead of a venule, as is seen in the majority of capillary systems (Fig. 4). This provides tighter control over the blood flow through the glomerulus, since arterioles dilate and constrict more readily than venules, owing to their thick circular smooth muscle layer (tunica media). The blood exiting the efferent arteriole enters a renal venule, which in turn enters a renal interlobular vein and then into the renal vein.

Cortical nephrons near the corticomedullary junction (15% of all nephrons) are called juxtamedullary nephrons. The blood exiting the efferent arterioles of these nephrons enter the vasa recta, which are straight capillary branches that deliver blood to the renal medulla. These vasa recta run adjacent to the descending and ascending loop of Henle and participate in the maintenance of the medullary countercurrent exchange system.

=== Filtrate drainage ===
The filtrate that has passed through the three-layered filtration unit enters Bowman's capsule. From there, it flows into the renal tubule—the nephron—which follows a U-shaped path to the collecting ducts, finally exiting into a renal calyx as urine.

== Function ==
=== Filtration ===
Scheme of filtration barrier (blood-urine) in the kidney. A. The endothelial cells of the glomerulus; 1. pore (fenestra). B. Glomerular basement membrane: 1. lamina rara interna 2. lamina densa 3. lamina rara externa C. Podocytes: 1. enzymatic and structural proteins 2. filtration slit 3. diaphragma

The main function of the glomerulus is to filter plasma to produce glomerular filtrate, which passes down the length of the nephron tubule to form urine. The rate at which the glomerulus produces filtrate from plasma (the glomerular filtration rate) is much higher than in systemic capillaries because of the particular anatomical characteristics of the glomerulus. Unlike systemic capillaries, which receive blood from high-resistance arterioles and drain to low-resistance venules, glomerular capillaries are connected in both ends to high-resistance arterioles: the afferent arteriole, and the efferent arteriole. This arrangement of two arterioles in series determines the high hydrostatic pressure on glomerular capillaries, which is one of the forces that favor filtration to Bowman's capsule.

If a substance has passed through the glomerular capillary endothelial cells, glomerular basement membrane, and podocytes, then it enters the lumen of the tubule and is known as glomerular filtrate. Otherwise, it exits the glomerulus through the efferent arteriole and continues circulation as discussed below and as shown on the picture.

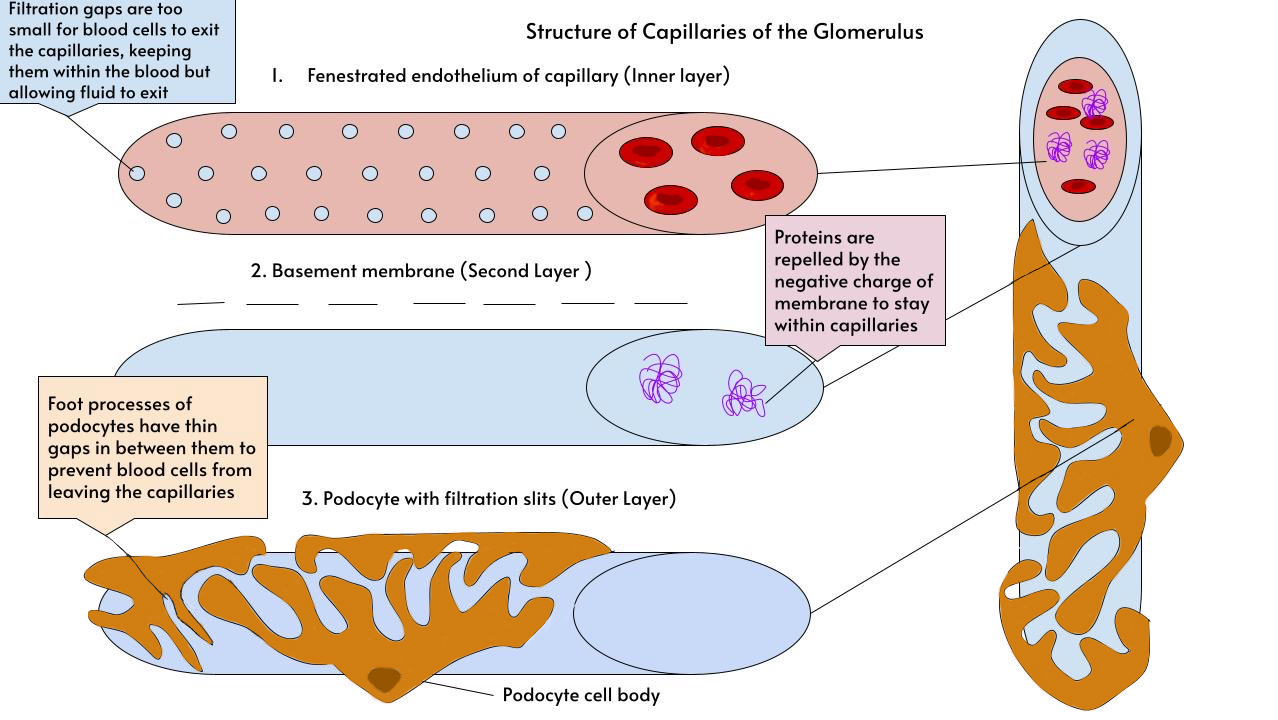

==== Permeability ====
The structures of the layers determine their permeability-selectivity (permselectivity). The factors that influence permselectivity are the negative charge of the basement membrane and the podocytic epithelium, as well as the effective pore size of the glomerular wall (8 nm). As a result, large and/or negatively charged molecules will pass through far less frequently than small and/or positively charged ones. For instance, small ions such as sodium and potassium pass freely, while larger proteins, such as hemoglobin and albumin have practically no permeability at all.

The oncotic pressure on glomerular capillaries is one of the forces that resist filtration. Because large and negatively charged proteins have a low permeability, they cannot filtrate easily to Bowman's capsule. Therefore, the concentration of these proteins tends to increase as the glomerular capillaries filtrate plasma, increasing the oncotic pressure along the glomerular capillary.

==== Starling equation ====
The rate of filtration from the glomerulus to Bowman's capsule is determined (as in systemic capillaries) by the Starling equation:

$$\ GFR = K_\mathrm{f} ((P_\mathrm{gc} - P_\mathrm{bc}) - (\pi_\mathrm{gc} - \pi_\mathrm{bc}))$$

- GFR is the glomerular filtration rate
- K_{f} is the filtration coefficient—a proportionality constant
- P_{gc} is the glomerular capillary hydrostatic pressure
- P_{bc} is the Bowman's capsule hydrostatic pressure
- π_{gc} is the glomerular capillary oncotic pressure
- π_{bc} is the Bowman's capsule oncotic pressure

=== Blood pressure regulation ===
The walls of the afferent arteriole contain specialized smooth muscle cells that synthesize renin. These juxtaglomerular cells play a major role in the renin–angiotensin system, which helps regulate blood volume and pressure.

== Clinical significance ==
Damage to the glomerulus by disease can allow passage through the glomerular filtration barrier of red blood cells, white blood cells, platelets, and blood proteins such as albumin and globulin. Underlying causes for glomerular injury can be inflammatory, toxic or metabolic. These can be seen in the urine (urinalysis) on microscopic and chemical (dipstick) examination. Glomerular diseases include diabetic kidney disease, glomerulonephritis (inflammation), glomerulosclerosis (hardening of the glomeruli), and IgA nephropathy.

Due to the connection between the glomerulus and the glomerular filtration rate, the glomerular filtration rate is of clinical significance when suspecting a kidney disease, when following up on a case of known kidney disease, or when evaluating the risk of further renal damage such as beginning medications with known nephrotoxicity.

== History ==
In 1666, Italian biologist and anatomist Marcello Malpighi first described the glomeruli and demonstrated their continuity with the renal vasculature (281,282). About 175 years later, surgeon and anatomist William Bowman elucidated in detail the capillary architecture of the glomerulus and the continuity between its surrounding capsule and the proximal tubule.

== See also ==
- Glomerulus
- Blood–brain barrier

== Additional images ==
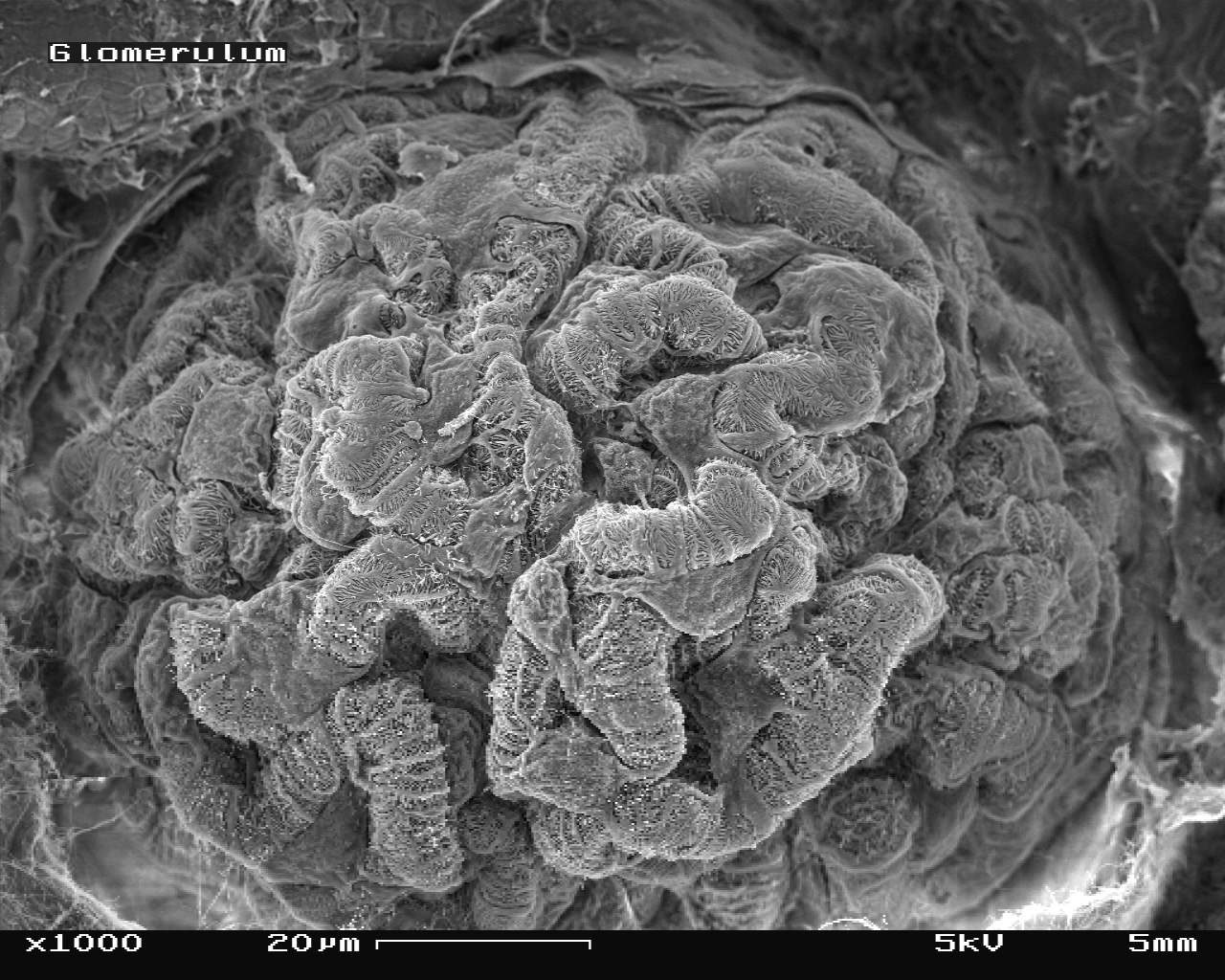
Scanning electron microscope image of a glomerulus in a mouse (1000x magnification)

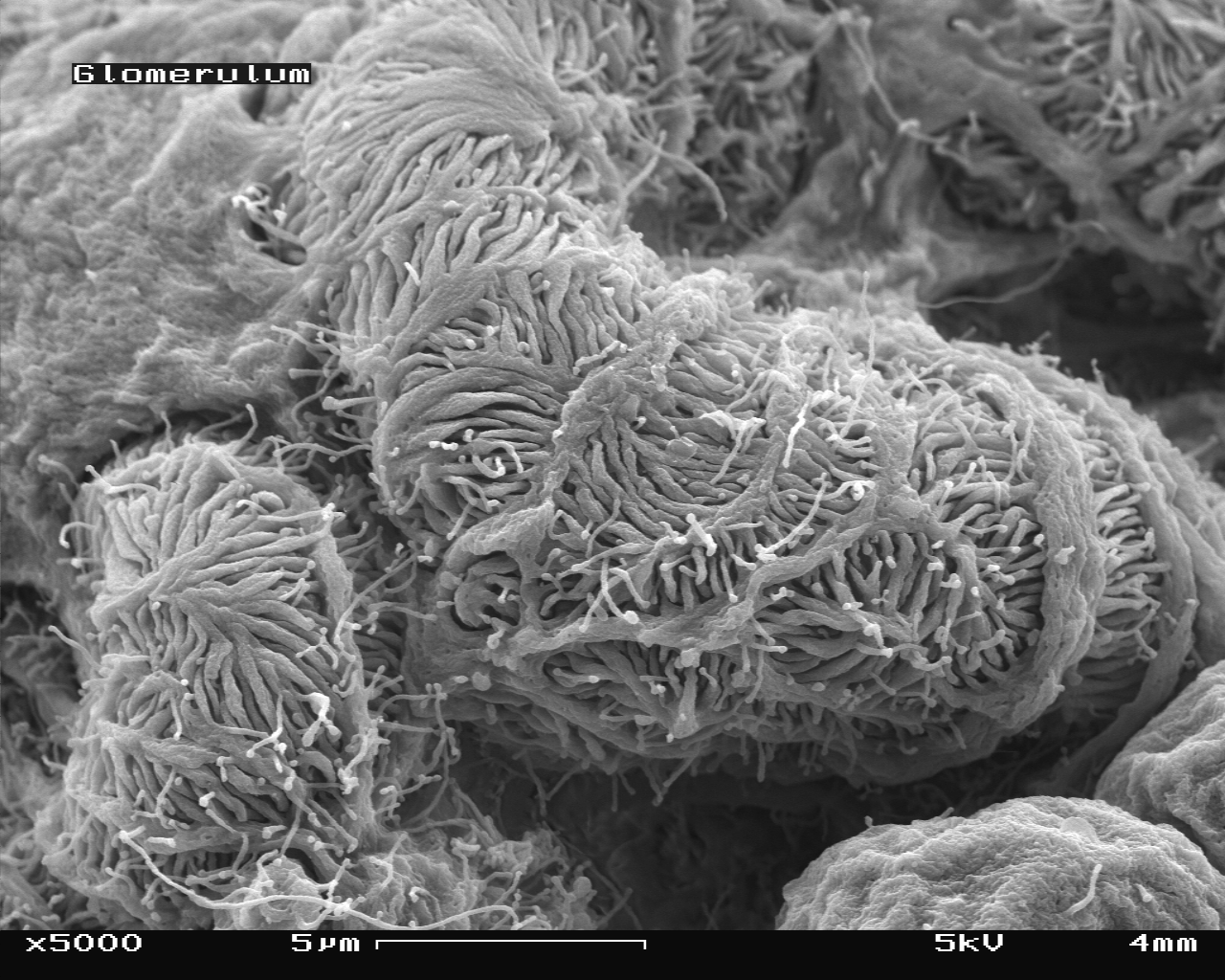
Scanning electron microscope image of a glomerulus in a mouse (5000x magnification)

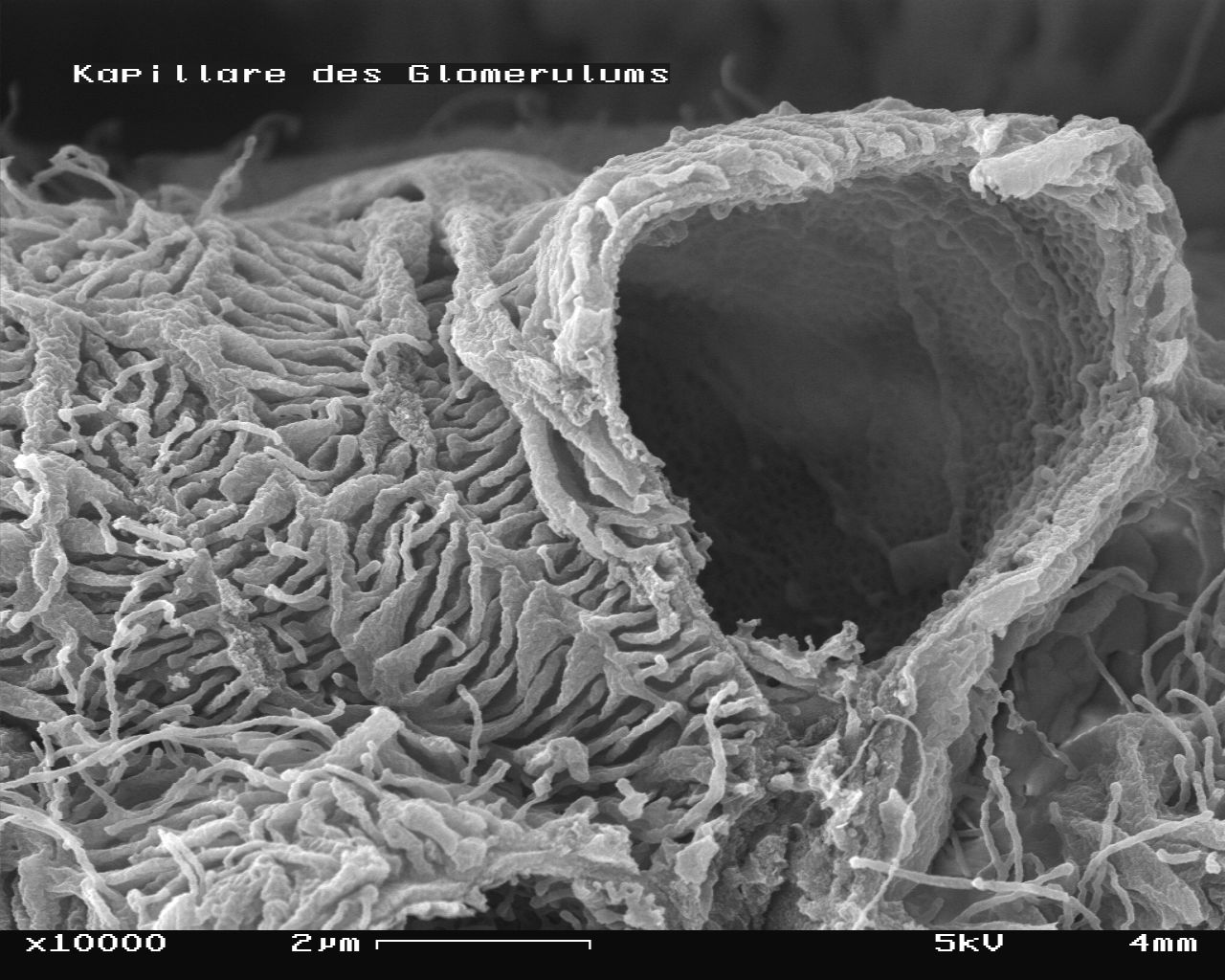
Scanning electron microscope image of a glomerulus in a mouse (10,000x magnification)

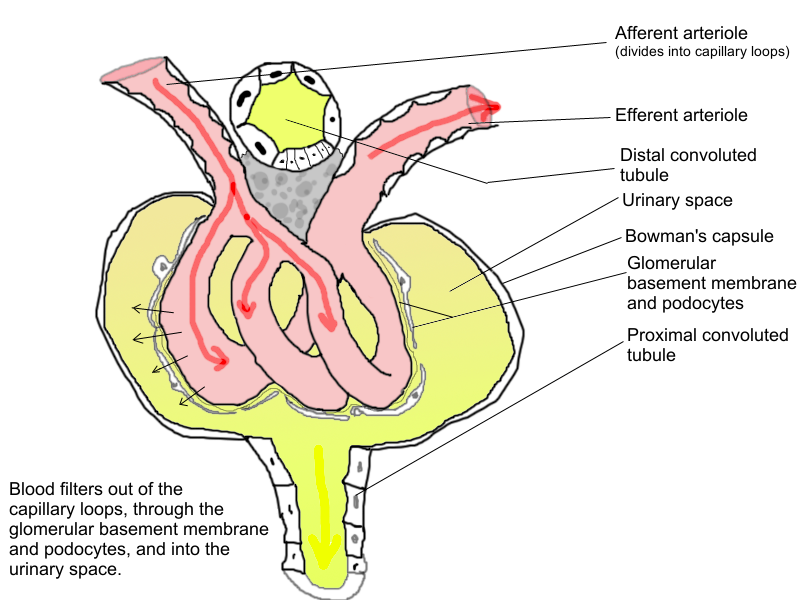
Looped capillaries of glomerulus between the arterioles

== Sources ==
- Hall, Arthur C. Guyton, John E. (2005). Textbook of medical physiology (11th ed.). Philadelphia: W.B. Saunders. p. Chapter 26. ISBN 978-0-7216-0240-0.
- Deakin, Barbara Young; drawings by Philip J.; et al. (2006). Wheater's Functional Histology: a text and colour atlas (5th ed.). [Edinburgh?]: Churchill Livingstone/Elsevier. p. Chapter 16. ISBN 978-0-443068508.
