= Renal hypoplasia =

Congenital abnormality of the kidneys

- Other names: Hypoplastic kidneys
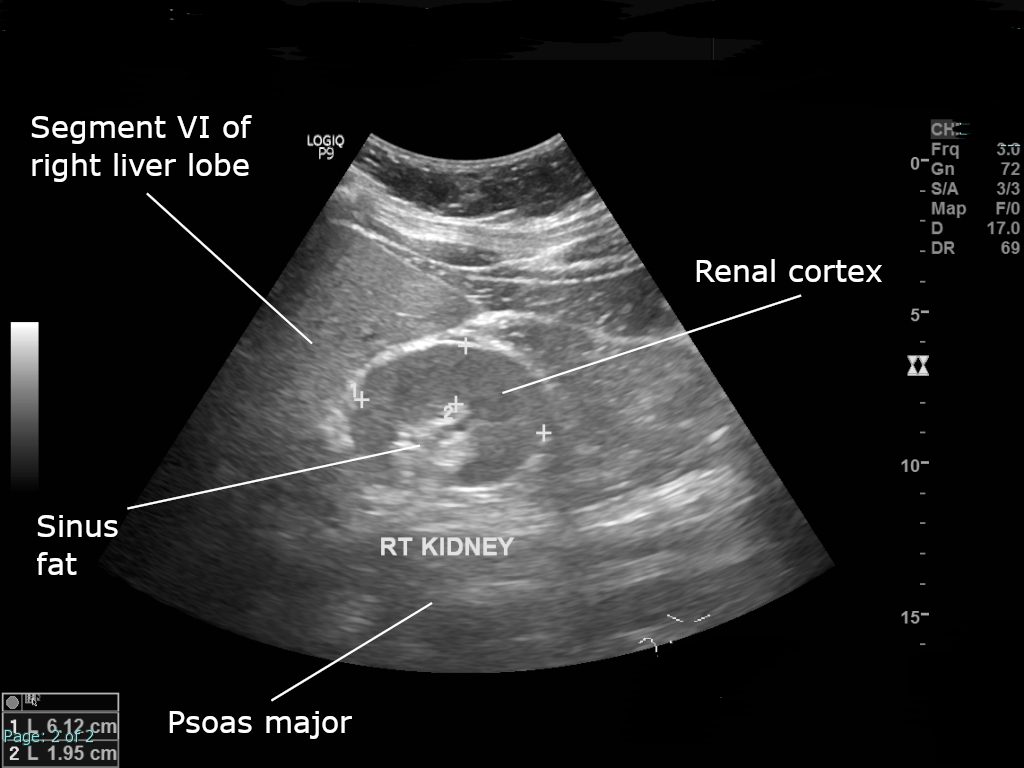
- An ultrasound scan of a hypoplastic right kidney in an adult male.
- Specialty: Nephrology
- Complications: Anuria, chronic kidney disease, glomerular hyperfiltration, hypertension, proteinuria, sepsis, urinary tract infection, urinary tract obstruction, urolithiasis
- Types: Simple, oligomeganephronic, segmental, cortical
- Causes: Mutation of the genes HNF1B, PAX2, PBX1
- Diagnostic method: Ultrasound
- Differential diagnosis: Renal dysplasia, oligomeganephronia
- Frequency: 1 in 400 births

Renal hypoplasia is a congenital abnormality in which one or both of the kidneys are smaller than normal, resulting in a reduced nephron number but with normal morphology.

It is defined as abnormally small kidneys, where the size is less than two standard deviations below the expected mean for the corresponding demographics, and the morphology is normal. The severity of the disease depends on whether hypoplasia is unilateral or bilateral, and the degree of reduction in the number of nephrons.

== Classification ==
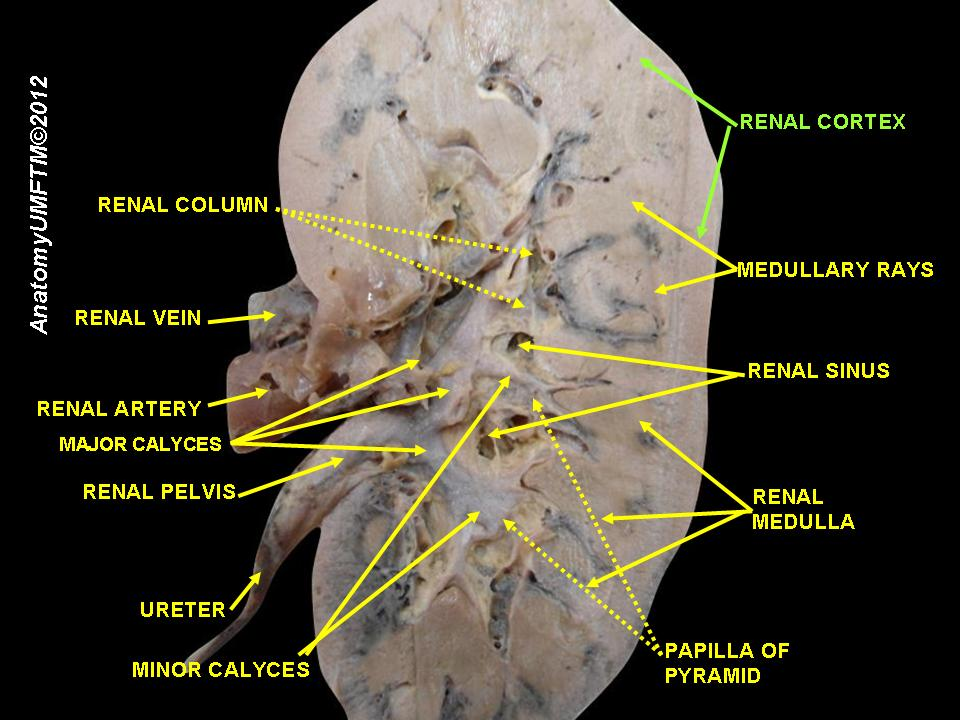
Renal lobe (renal cortex green with renal pyramid below)

Renal hypoplasia pertains to the reduction in the number of renal lobes. The classification of renal hypoplasia establishes four types, termed simple, oligomeganephronic, segmental, and cortical.

=== Simple hypoplasia ===
Simple hypoplasia is characterized by either one kidney weighing 50% or less of that of the normal, or the combined weight of both kidneys being less than 33% of that of the normal. Often accompanied by hypertension. The number of lobules and calyces is reduced to five or fewer, compared to the usual ten or more. Enlargement of the nephrons is not present in this type, considering it is associated with oligomeganephronia. The histology is normal. Cysts or dysplasia are absent and apart from its decreased size, every other facet of the kidneys is unaffected. If unilateral, the contralateral kidney can undergo hypertrophy to compensate for the affected kidney, and renal function stays normal. If bilateral, progressive renal insufficiency is expected.

=== Oligomeganephronia ===
Oligomeganephronia (or oligomeganephronic hypoplasia) is a rare pediatric renal disease where the number of nephrons is reduced but is distinctly enlarged. Tubules are also enlarged. This type of hypoplasia is more prevalent in males with a ratio of three-to-one and is caused by either renal-coloboma syndrome, branchiootorenal syndrome, acro renal syndrome, or wolf-hirschhorn syndrome. Both kidneys are affected symmetrically unless paired with unilateral agenesis, which is uncommon. Morphology is normal. The combined length of both kidneys is 80% or lower than a single normal kidney and the glomerular filtration rate is reduced to 30% of the normal. The number of renal lobes is reduced to five to six or occasionally as few as one or two. The number of nephrons per lobe is reduced as well. Malformations of the urinary tract and nephrosclerosis are absent and vesicoureteral reflux is insignificant. Unlike segmental hypoplasia, hypertension is rarely present in this type. The affected are generally born premature or small for their gestational age. Most cases are sporadic but some are inherited. It has been reported that the affected person can have a twin or sibling with the same condition. In the first few years of the affected individual's life, dehydration, polyuria and polydipsia are present, followed by hyperfiltration alongside proteinuria, with progressive renal failure to come after, its onset determined by the combined renal mass. The end-stage renal disease occurs between six months and seventeen years.

=== Segmental hypoplasia ===
Segmental hypoplasia or Ask-Upmark kidney is a rare renal disease where a part of the kidney has undergone hypoplasia. The number of renal lobes is reduced, and the kidney size is less than two standard deviations from the average, with the weight often being over 50g in adults and 12–25g in children. This type of hypoplasia can be either unilateral or bilateral and is more prevalent in females by 72%. The enzyme renin is overly secreted, causing hypertension and is often severe. Calyces are enlarged, glomeruli are absent in the cortex, and the medulla is either non-existent or underdeveloped. Vesicoureteral reflux and urinary tract infections are commonly present, while cysts, dysplasia, and proteinuria are absent. The surface of the kidney has a pelvic recess and one or more transverse cortical grooves, presumed to be a failed formation of a renal lobe. The renal parenchyma next to the hypoplastic part of the kidney is seemingly normal; however, it can undergo hypertrophy, making the grooves more noticeable.

=== Cortical hypoplasia ===
Cortical hypoplasia is a not widely known type of renal hypoplasia where the number of nephron generations is reduced, causing the renal medulla to reduce in size and the renal cortex to decrease in thickness throughout the person's life. This type of hypoplasia is frequently paired with other forms of renal hypoplasia and seems to portray an arrest of nephrogenesis, leading to fewer nephron generations, resulting in smaller renal size in general. The nephrogenesis before the arrest is normal. On the other hand, the medullary rays and renal pyramids have decreased in size with the radial glomerular count reduced to eight or less.

== Signs and symptoms ==
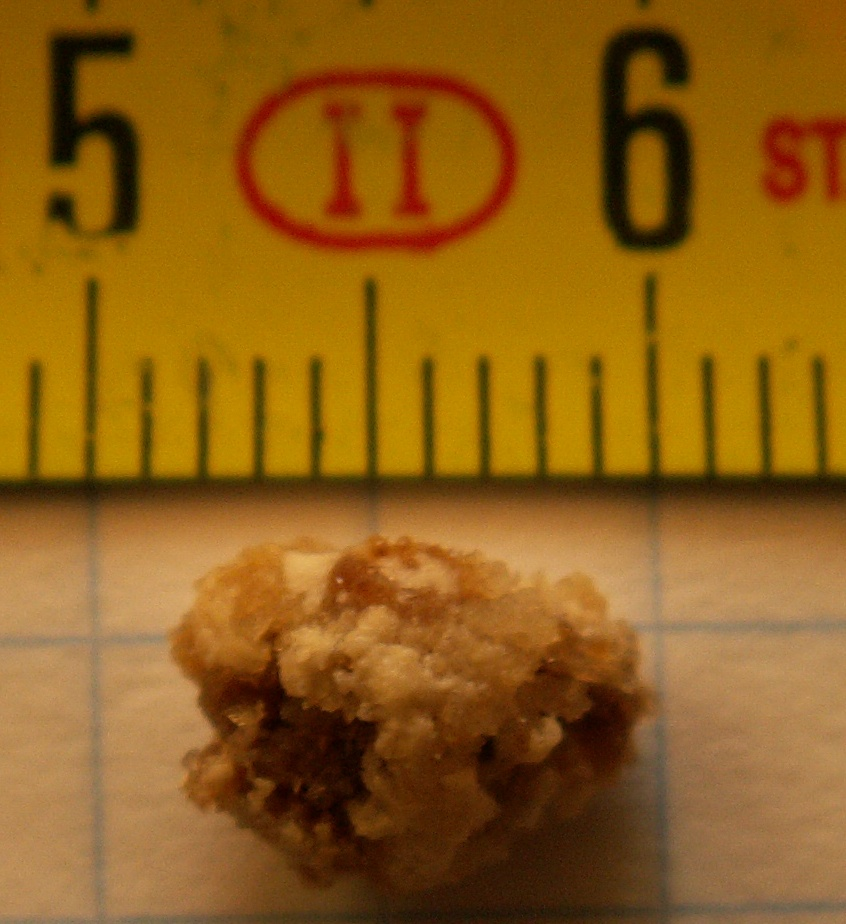
Kidney stone

Hypoplastic kidneys have a reduced nephron number, but normal corticomedullary differentiation. The condition is usually asymptomatic, otherwise infection and kidney stone formation can occur.

=== Complications ===
Renal hypoplasia is a common cause of kidney failure in children and also of adult-onset disease.

== Causes ==
The etiology of this condition is in the mutations in kidney-related genes, namely, HNF1B, PAX2, PBX1. However, environmental factors like maternal diseases such as diabetes, hypertension, and intoxication via smoking and alcohol are linked to renal hypoplasia.

== Diagnosis ==
In terms of the diagnosis of renal hypoplasia, the following is done in its evaluation:

- Clinical exam
- Abdominal ultrasound
- CT scan
- MRI scan

== Management ==
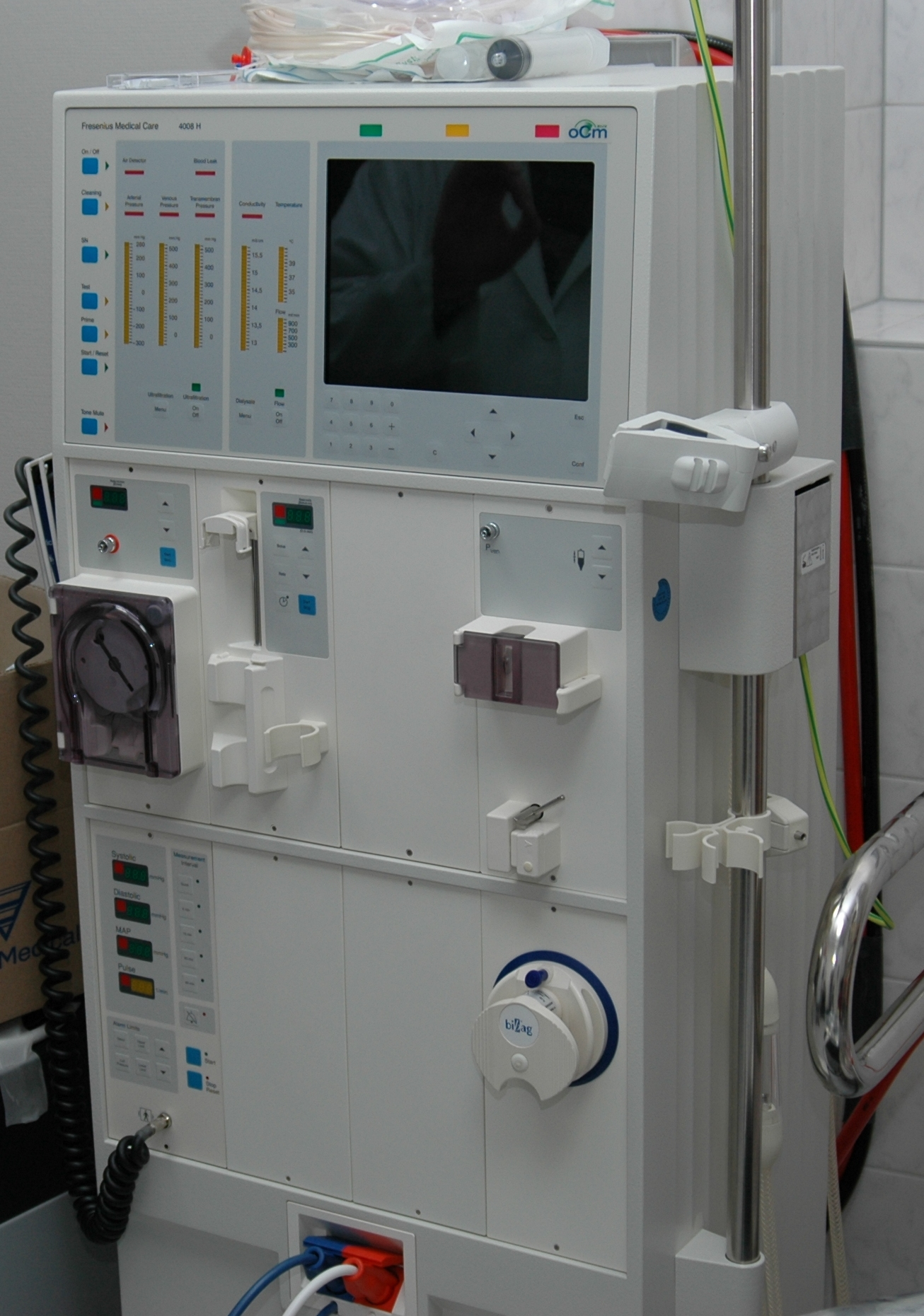
Hemodialysis

The treatment of renal hypoplasia depends on the severity of the chronic kidney disease. Renal replacement therapy is a possibility.

== Epidemiology ==
Epidemiologic studies point to an estimated incidence of 1 in 400 births.

== Etymology ==
The word renal comes from the Late Latin word renalis ("related to the kidneys"), from the Latin word renes ("kidneys").

The prefix hypo- comes from the Ancient Greek word ὑπο hupo ("under").

The suffix -plasia comes from the Neo-Latin word plasia, from the Ancient Greek word πλάσις plásis ("molding, formation").
