= Orthostatic albuminuria =

- Other names: Orthostatic proteinuria, Postural proteinuria, Postural albuminuria.
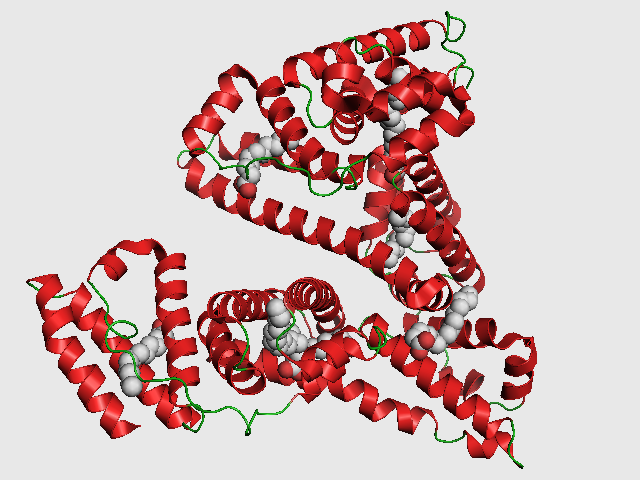
- The structure of Human serum albumin (HSA) complexed with 6 palmitic acid molecules
- Pronunciation: ȯr-thə-ˈsta-tik /ælˌbjuməˈn(j)ʊriə/
- Specialty: Urology
- Usual onset: Under 30 years old
- Diagnostic method: Urine test strip, Urine protein/creatinine ratio, 24 hour urine collection, renal function tests, and urine microscopy.
- Differential diagnosis: Transient proteinuria
- Prognosis: Benign.
- Frequency: 3 to 5% of adults and teenagers

Orthostatic albuminuria, also known as orthostatic proteinuria, is defined by raised levels of urine protein excretion while in an upright position. In orthostatic albuminuria urine protein excretion returns to normal while in a supine position, such as laying down. Orthostatic albuminuria is the most common cause of isolated proteinuria in those under 20. The prevalence of orthostatic albuminuria is suspected to be between 2 and 5%, however some studies suggest that it is more common. Orthostatic albuminuria is diagnosed if urine protein levels are normal in a morning urine sample and there are no other obvious causes of albuminuria. Patients with orthostatic albuminuria are often asymptomatic and there is no indication for any type of treatment or interventions.

== Causes ==
The exact causes of orthostatic albuminuria are unknown however three different theories have been proposed, a normal variant, subtle glomerular abnormalities, exaggerated hemodynamic response, and left renal vein entrapment.

== Diagnosis ==
There is no standard test for orthostatic albuminuria. Physical examination as well as a past medical history can help determine the extent of symptoms in some individuals. Urine analysis, urine cytology, complement activity, urine culture, and serological studies can help differentiate orthostatic albuminuria from other causes of proteinuria. Recumbent and upright urine protein to creatinine ratio is often used as a screening test. 24-hour split urine testing is often tested.

Additional causes of albuminuria include glomerulopathy, acute tubular necrosis, Alport syndrome, toxins, proximal renal tubular acidosis, diabetes mellitus, malignancies, polycystic kidney disease, infections, and chronic kidney disease.

== Outlook ==
The long-term prognosis of orthostatic albuminuria hasn't yet been established. Based on current research, it seems that orthostatic albuminuria is a benign condition and typically resolves spontaneously within a couple years.

== See also ==
- Proteinuria
- Albuminuria
