= Benign nephrosclerosis =

Medical condition

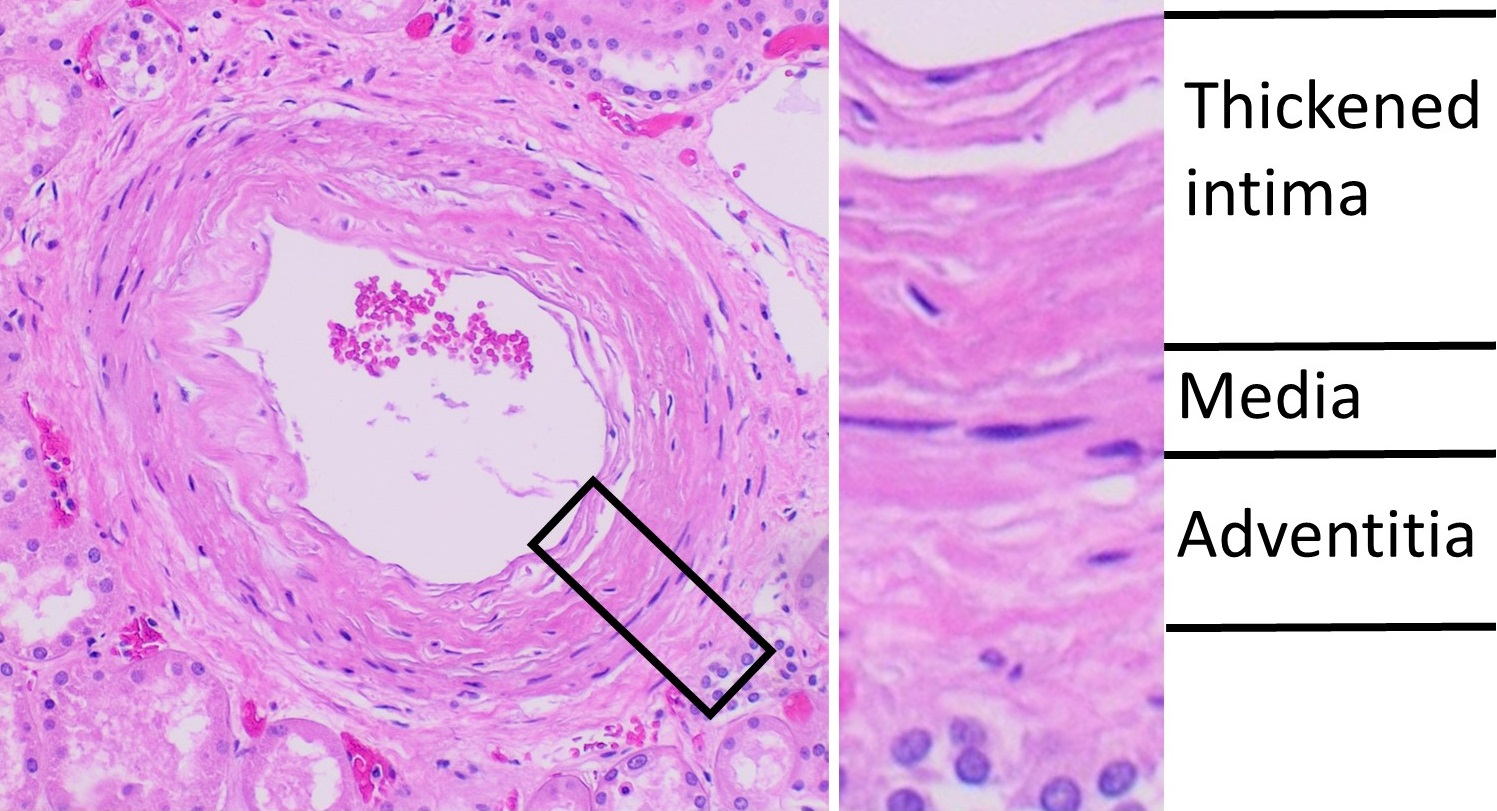
Histopathology of arcuate artery nephrosclerosis, seen as a thickened intima with an onion skin-like architecture. It is presumably a manifestation of hypertensive kidney disease.

Benign nephrosclerosis refers to the renal changes most commonly occurring in association with long-standing hypertension. It is termed benign because it rarely progresses to clinically significant chronic kidney disease or kidney failure.

== Morphology ==
The kidneys appear symmetrically atrophic and there is a reduced nephron mass. The kidneys have a surface of diffuse, fine granularity that resembles grain leather. Microscopically, the basic anatomic change consists of hyaline thickening of the walls of the small arteries and arterioles (hyaline arteriolosclerosis). Under a microscope, this appears as a homogeneous, pink hyaline thickening at the expense of the vessel lumina, with loss of underlying cellular detail. The narrowing of the lumen restricts blood flow, resulting in ischemia. All structures of the kidney can show ischemic atrophy although glomerular ischemic atrophy may be patchy. In advanced cases of benign nephrosclerosis the glomerular tufts may become globally sclerosed. Diffuse tubular atrophy and interstitial fibrosis are present. Often there is a scant interstitial lymphocytic infiltrate. The larger blood vessels (interlobar and arcuate arteries) show reduplication of internal elastic lamina along with fibrous thickening of the media (fibroelastic hyperplasia) and the subintima.

== Clinical Course ==
Benign nephrosclerosis alone hardly ever causes severe damage to the kidney, except in susceptible populations, such as African Americans, where it may lead to uremia and death. However, all persons with this disease usually show some functional impairment, such as loss of concentration or a variably diminished GFR. A mild degree of proteinuria is a frequent finding.

== See also ==
- Hypertensive kidney disease
