= Rosanna Gusmano =

Italian doctor (1928–2011)

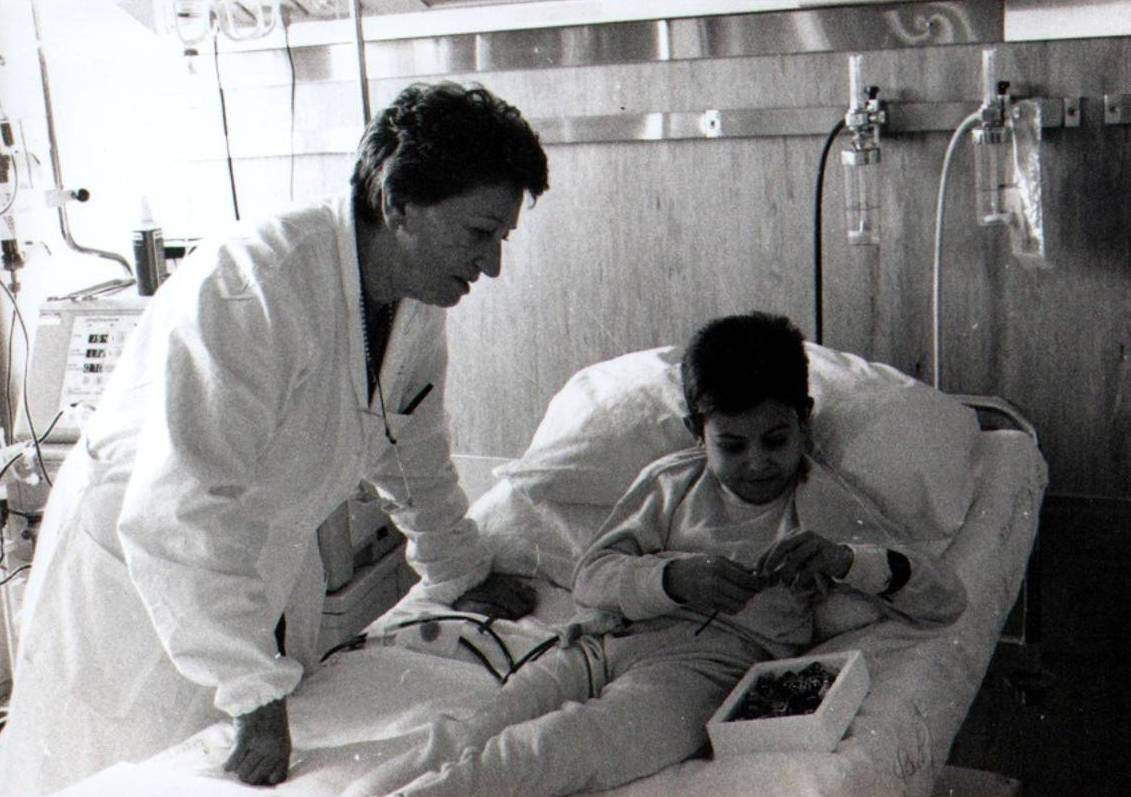
Rosanna Gusmano with child undergoing dialysis

Rosanna Gusmano (10 November 1928 Casale Monferrato - 12 February 2011 Genoa ) was an Italian doctor, author, and teacher. She is considered a pioneer in pediatric nephrology, having introduced many new renal disease treatments to Italy. She also founded both the Child Kidney Disease Fund and the Child Renal Foundation to help with further research.

== Early life and career ==
In 1937, she moved with her mother to Massawa, intending to reunite with her father in Ethiopia. During this time, her father was briefly captured by the British, but was able to reunite with them as the war came to a close. After World War II, she began studying medicine at the Asmara school. Two years later, she returned to Italy and graduated in 1953 from the University of Genoa, specializing in pediatrics in 1955. She began working at the Gaslini Pediatric Hospital in Genoa, later moving to Verona in 1968 to learn dialysis techniques. In the early 1970s, Gusmano and several colleagues studied cases of Lesch-Nyhan syndrome and Ask-Upmark kidney, as well as the first clinically diagnosed cases of diseases such as nephronophthisis.

=== Introducing Pediatric Nephrology to Italy ===
Gusmano was responsible for starting the practice of Pediatric Nephrology in Italy when, on January 6, 1969, she started treating a twelve-year-old suffering from renal polycystic using chronic hemodialysis. In 1970 Gusmano obtained her professorship at a pediatric clinic, later moving to Turin in 1974. In 1976, she and Franca Pellini were able to get home dialysis approved in Liguria.

=== Work on Hemodialysis and Peritoneal Dialysis ===
Working with the Gaslini Institute, Gusmano continued to popularize hemodialysis for children throughout the 70s. Given how little useful research existed before this work, a large number of doctors from across Italy wound up traveling to Gaslini to learn these new methodologies. The process of Hemodialysis requires an extensive time commitment on the part of both children and staff (roughly two 10-hour sessions a week) and carries the risk of thrombosis. The new pediatric treatments involved, among other things, the reduction in the size of the filtering surface, frequently restoring the cannula, as well as increased sterilization and testing procedures, which greatly reduced the risk of the procedure to young and developing bodies.

Peritoneal Dialysis became increasingly popular in pediatric nephrology throughout the 1970s. It functions as a home treatment that uses a cycler for night-time dialysis. It is especially helpful for children with end-stage renal failure, allowing them limited hospital time and the freedom to attend school during the day. In response to these developments, in 1986 Gusmano invited the heads of various Italian centers that were developing Peritoneal Dialysis to Genoa, creating the Italian Pediatric Peritoneal Dialysis Registry, which coordinates with several other European countries.

== Child Kidney Disease Fund ==
In 1976, Gusmano started an ONLUS to support the nephrology department of the Giannina Gaslini Institute in coordination with the Italian Red Cross and Women Manager Association. In the early 1990s, the fund purchased the first ultrasound system for the department and invested in experimental home care for children on dialysis who were too far to regularly visit in person.

== Later work and Child Renal Foundation ==
Gusmano was appointed vice president of the Italian Society of Pediatric Nephrology in 1984. In 1987, she collaborated with Umberto Vallente to create one of the first pediatric transplant centers in Italy. That same year, she started the physiopathology laboratory of uremia, which focuses heavily on the study of proteinuria and nephrotic syndrome In 2004, Gusmano founded the Renal Child Foundation to further research into pediatric nephrology and remained president of it until her death in 2011. It still exists as of 2020.

== Works ==
Gusmano wrote 450 articles in both Italian and international scientific journals as well as sections of nephrology books

- Critical evaluation of the results of hemodialysis in the pediatric age, in collaboration with Giulio Gilli and Francesco Perfumo, Minerva nefrologica, 1972, vol. 19, pp. 60–69.
- Lesch-Nyhan disease. First Italian cases, in collaboration with Giancarlo Basile, Giulio Gilli and Francesco Perfumo, Minerva Pediatrica, 1974, vol. 26, pp. 241–251.
- A rare cause of hypertension in childhood: the Ask-Upmark kidney, in collaboration with Giancarlo Basile, Francesco Perfumo and Franco Pontiggia, Minerva Nefrologica, 1974, vol. 21, pp. 12–19.
- Plasma carnitine concentrations and dyslipidemia in children on maintenance hemodyalisis, in collaboration with Roberta Oleggini and Francesco Perfumo, J. Pediatr., 1981, vol. 99, pp. 429–432.
- Long-term prognosis of haemolytic-uraemic syndrome in children, in collaboration with Mariarosa Ciardi, Francesco Perfumo and Marcella Sarperi, Adv. Exp. Med. Biol., 1987, vol. 212, pp. 199–204.
- Kidney disease in children, in collaboration with Francesco Perfumo, Wichtig, Milan, 1991, pp. 504.
