= Renovascular hypertension =

High blood pressure due to lack of blood flow to the kidneys

- Other names: Renal hypertension
- 3D rendered CT of abdominal aortic branches kidneys
- Specialty: Cardiology, nephrology
- Symptoms: High BP, kidney dysfunction
- Risk factors: Diabetes, High cholesterol
- Diagnostic method: Blood and urine test
- Treatment: Antihypertensive, Stress reduction

Renovascular hypertension is a condition in which high blood pressure is caused by the kidneys' hormonal response to narrowing of the arteries supplying the kidneys. When functioning properly this hormonal axis regulates blood pressure. Due to low local blood flow, the kidneys mistakenly increase blood pressure of the entire circulatory system. It is a form of secondary hypertension - a form of hypertension whose cause is identifiable.

== Signs and symptoms ==
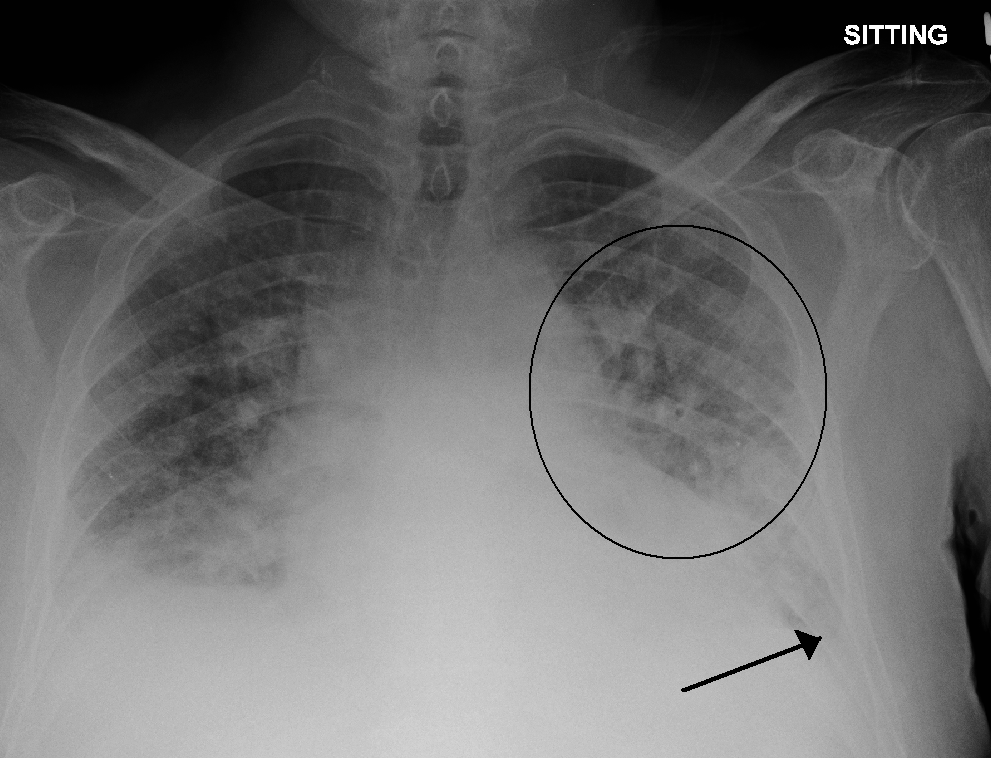
Pulmonary edema

Symptoms of renovascular hypertension include the following:

- High blood pressure (early age)
- Kidney dysfunction
- Narrowing of arteries elsewhere in the body
- Pulmonary edema

== Causes ==
Renovascular hypertension is caused by diminished blood flow to one or both kidneys. As a result, the kidneys release hormones that cause the body to retain sodium and water, leading to elevated blood pressure. There are many causes of decreased blood flow to the kidneys. These include:

- Atherosclerotic renal artery stenosis
- Fibromuscular dysplasia
- Systemic vasculitis
- Renal artery aneurysm
- Arteriovenous fistula
- Arterial embolism due to endovascular manipulation
- Renin-secreting renal tumor
- Subcapsular hematoma of the kidney
- Radiation fibrosis
- Extrinsic compression of the renal artery or kidney by a mass (tumor)

== Pathogenesis ==
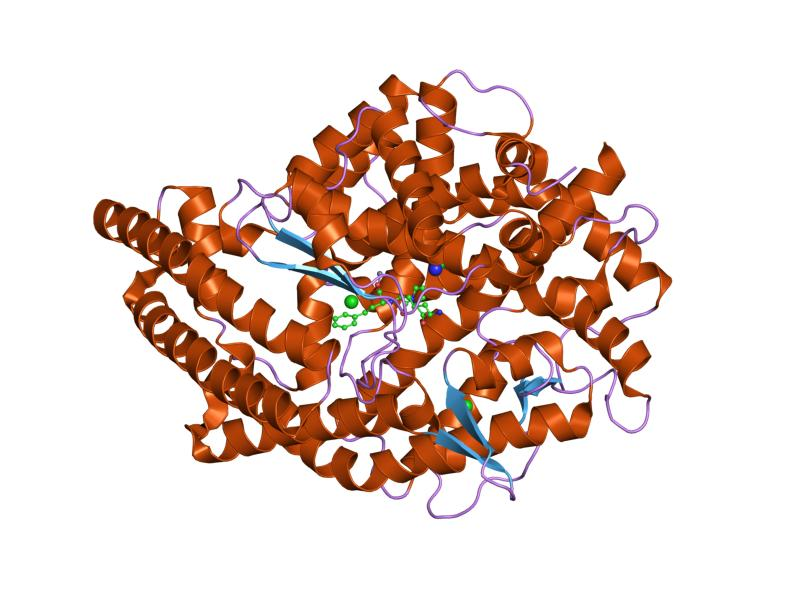
Angiotension converting enzyme

The pathogenesis of renovascular hypertension involves the narrowing of the arteries supplying the kidneys which causes a low perfusion pressure that is detected by the juxtaglomerular apparatus (via the macula densa cells, which act as baroreceptors; located on the afferent arteriole wall). This leads to renin secretion that causes the angiotensinogen conversion to angiotensin I. Angiotensin I then proceeds to the lung where it is converted to angiotensin II via angiotensin converting enzyme (ACE).

In most people fibromuscular dysplasia or atherosclerosis is the reason for the occlusion of a renal artery which ultimately leads to this condition.

== Diagnosis ==
The diagnosis for renovascular hypertension is done by:

- Blood test (for renal function)
- Urinary test (tests for microalbuminuria)
- Rapid-sequence urogram
- Serology (to exclude systemic lupus erythematosus )
- Lipid profile
- Urinalysis (to exclude presence of red blood cells)

== Treatment ==
In terms of treatment for renovascular hypertension surgical revascularization versus medical therapy for atherosclerosis, it is not clear if one option is better than the other according to a 2014 Cochrane review; balloon angioplasty did show a small improvement in blood pressure .

Surgery can include percutaneous surgical revascularization, and also nephrectomy or autotransplantation, and the individual may be given beta-adrenergic blockers. Early therapeutic intervention is important if ischemic nephropathy is to be prevented. Inpatient care is necessary for the management of hypertensive urgencies, quick intervention is required to prevent further damage to the kidneys.

== Prognosis ==
The prognosis of individuals with renovascular hypertension is not easy to determine. Those with atherosclerotic renal artery disease have a high risk of mortality, furthermore, those who also have renal dysfunction have a higher mortality risk. However, the majority of renovascular diseases can be improved with surgery.

== See also ==
- Fibromuscular dysplasia
- Hypertensive nephropathy
- Kidney failure
- Renal artery stenosis
