= Protein toxicity =

Buildup of metabolic waste due to kidney dysfunction

Protein toxicity is the effect of the buildup of protein metabolic waste compounds, like urea, uric acid, ammonia, and creatinine. Protein toxicity has many causes, including urea cycle disorders, genetic mutations, excessive protein intake, and insufficient kidney function, such as chronic kidney disease and acute kidney injury. Symptoms of protein toxicity include unexplained vomiting and loss of appetite. Untreated protein toxicity can lead to serious complications such as seizures, encephalopathy, further kidney damage, and even death.

One form of protein toxicity, called "protein poisoning" or "rabbit starvation", was described by arctic explorer Vilhjalmur Stefansson as occurring when a person survives on lean animals such as rabbit, without consuming sufficient fats or carbohydrates over an endured period. This form of acute malnutrition results from a very high proportion of dietary protein rather than a lack of calories, despite adequate food intake.

== Definition ==
Protein toxicity occurs when protein metabolic wastes build up in the body. During protein metabolism, nitrogenous wastes such as urea, uric acid, ammonia, and creatinine are produced. These compounds are not utilized by the human body and are usually excreted by the kidney. However, due to conditions such as renal insufficiency, the under-functioning kidney is unable to excrete these metabolic wastes, causing them to accumulate in the body and lead to toxicity. Although there are many causes of protein toxicity, this condition is most prevalent in people with chronic kidney disease who consume a protein-rich diet, specifically, proteins from animal sources that are rapidly digested and metabolized, causing the release of a high concentration of protein metabolic wastes in the blood stream rapidly.

== Causes and pathophysiology ==
Protein toxicity has a significant role in neurodegenerative diseases, whether it is due to high protein intake, pathological disorders leading to the accumulation of protein waste products, the inefficient metabolism of the proteins, or oligomerization of the amino acids from proteolysis. The mechanism by which protein can lead to well known neurodegenerative diseases includes transcriptions dysfunction, propagation, pathological cytoplasmic inclusions, mitochondrial and stress granule dysfunction.

Ammonia, one of the waste products of protein metabolism, is very harmful, especially to the brain, where it crosses the blood brain barrier leading to a whole range of neurological dysfunctions from cognitive impairment to death. The brain has a mechanism to counteract the presence of this waste metabolite. One of the mechanisms involved in the impairment of the brain is the compromise of astrocyte potassium buffering, where astrocytes play a key role. However, as more ammonia crosses, the system gets saturated, leading to astrocyte swelling and brain edema.

Urea is another waste product that originates from protein metabolism in humans. However, urea is used by the body as a source of nitrogen essential for growth and life. The most relevant disorders on the urea cycle are genetic, leading to defective enzymes or transporters inhibiting the reabsorption of urate with the subsequent increase in levels of ammonia, which is toxic.

High protein intake can lead to high protein waste, and this is different from protein poisoning since the issue relates to the high level of the waste metabolites. Usually, when protein consumption goes above one-third of the food we consumed, this situation presents. The liver has a limited capacity and will not deaminate proteins, leading to increased nitrogen in the body. The rate at which urea is excreted can not keep up with the rate at which it is produced. The catabolism of amino acids can lead to toxic levels of ammonia. Furthermore, there is a limited rate at which the gastrointestinal tract can absorb amino acids from proteins.

Uric acid is not a waste metabolite derived from protein metabolism, but many high protein diets also contain higher relative fractions of nucleic acids. One of the two types of nucleic acids, purines (the other being pyrimidines, which are not problematic), are metabolized to uric acid in humans when in excess, which can lead to problems, chiefly gout.

The kidneys play an essential role in the reabsorption and excretion of uric acid. Certain transporters located in the nephron in the apical and basolateral surfaces regulate uric acid serum levels. Uric acid is not as toxic as other nitrogen derivates. It has an antioxidant function in the blood at low levels. People with compromised kidneys will have a lower excretion of uric acid leading to several diseases, including further renal damage, cardiovascular disease, diabetes, and gout.

Creatinine might not be a direct indicator of protein toxicity; however, it is important to mention that creatinine could increase due to overwork by the kidneys exposed to high levels of protein waste. Also, high serum creatinine levels could indicate decreased renal filtration rate due to kidney disease, increase byproduct as a consequence of muscle breakdown, or high protein intake.

== Effects of a high protein diet ==
A high-protein diet is a health concern for those suffering from kidney disease. The main concern is that a high protein intake may promote further renal damage that can lead to protein toxicity. The physiological changes induced by an increased protein intake, such as an increased glomerular pressure and hyperfiltration, place further strain on already damaged kidneys. This strain can lead to proteins being inadequately metabolized and subsequently causing toxicity. A high-protein diet can lead to complications for those with renal disease and has been linked to further progression of the disease. The well-known Nurses' Health Study found a correlation between the loss of kidney function and an increased dietary intake of animal protein by people who had already been diagnosed with renal disease. This association suggests that a total protein intake that exceeds the recommendations may accelerate renal disease and lead to risk of protein toxicity within a diseased individual. For this reason, dietary protein restriction is a common treatment for people with renal disease in which proteinuria is present. Protein restricted individuals have been shown to have slower rates of progression of their renal diseases.

Several studies, however, have found no evidence of protein toxicity due to high protein intakes harming kidney function in healthy people. Diets that regularly exceed the recommendations for protein intake have been found to lead to an increased glomerular filtration rate in the kidneys and also have an effect on the hormone systems in the body. It is well established that these physiological effects are harmful to individuals with renal disease, but research has not found these responses to be detrimental to those who are healthy and demonstrate adequate renal activity. In people with healthy kidney function, the kidneys work continuously to excrete the by-products of protein metabolism which prevents protein toxicity from occurring. In response to an increased consumption of dietary protein, the kidneys maintain homeostasis within the body by operating at an increased capacity, producing a higher amount of urea and subsequently excreting it from the body. Although some researchers have proposed that this increase in waste production and excretion will cause increased strain on the kidneys, other research has not supported this. Currently, evidence suggests that changes in renal function that occur in response to an increased dietary protein intake are part of the normal adaptive system employed by the body to sustain homeostasis. In a healthy individual with well-functioning kidneys, there is no need for concern that an increased dietary protein intake will lead to protein toxicity and decreased renal function.

Protein toxicity and other metabolic disorders associated with chronic kidney failure have been shown to be related to more systemic complications such as atherosclerosis, anemia, malnutrition, and hyperparathyroidism.

== Symptoms ==
Unexplained vomiting and a loss of appetite are indicators of protein toxicity. If those two symptoms are accompanied by an ammonia quality on the breath, the onset of kidney failure is a likely culprit. People with kidney disease who are not on dialysis are advised to avoid consumption of protein if possible, as consuming too much accelerates the condition and can lead to death. Most of the problems stem from the accumulation of unfiltered toxins and wastes from protein metabolism.

Kidney function naturally declines with age due to the gradual loss of nephrons (filters) in the kidney.

Common causes of chronic kidney disease include diabetes, heart disease, long term untreated high blood pressure, as well as abuse of analgesics like ibuprofen, aspirin, and paracetamol. Kidney disease like the polycystic kidney disease can be genetic in nature and progress as the individual ages.

== Diagnosis ==
Under normal conditions in the body, ammonia, urea, uric acid, and creatinine are produced by protein metabolism and excreted through the kidney as urine. When these by-products cannot be excreted properly from the body they will accumulate and become highly toxic. Protein consumption is a major source of these waste products. An accumulation of these waste products can occur in people with kidney insufficiency who eat a diet rich in protein and therefore can not excrete the waste properly.

Blood urea nitrogen (BUN) test measures the amount of urea nitrogen in the blood. Increased levels of urea in the blood (uremia) is an indicator for poor elimination of urea from the body usually due to kidney damage. Increased BUN levels can be caused by kidney diseases, kidney stones, congestive heart failure, fever, and gastrointestinal bleedings. BUN levels can also be elevated in pregnant women and people whose diet consists mainly of protein.

Increased creatinine levels in the blood can also be a sign of kidney damage and inability to excrete protein waste by-products properly.

A confirmation of kidney disease or kidney failure is often obtained by performing a blood test which measures the concentration of creatinine and urea (BUN). A creatinine blood test and BUN test are usually performed together along with other blood panels for diagnosis.

== Treatment ==
Treatment options for protein toxicity can include renal replacement therapies like hemodialysis and hemofiltration.

Lifestyle modifications like a diet low in protein, decreased sodium intake, and exercise can also be in incorporated as part of a treatment plan.

Medications may also be prescribed depending on symptoms. Common medications prescribed for kidney diseases include hypertension medications like angiotensin converting enzyme inhibitors (ACEI) and angiotensin II receptor blockers (ARB) as they have been found to be kidney protective. Diuretics may also be prescribed to facilitate with waste excretion as well as any fluid retention.

Kidney transplant surgery is another treatment option where a healthy kidney is donated from a living or deceased donor to the recipient.

== Complications ==
Accumulation of protein metabolic waste products in the body can cause diseases and serious complications such as gout, uremia, acute renal failure, seizure, encephalopathy, and death. These products of protein metabolism, including urea, uric acid, ammonia, and creatinine, are compounds that the human body must eliminate in order for the body to function properly.

The build up of uric acid causing high amount of uric acid in blood, is a condition called hyperuricemia. Long-standing hyperuricemia can cause deposition of monosodium urate crystals in or around joints, resulting in an arthritic condition called gout.

When the body is unable to eliminate urea, it can cause a serious medical condition called uremia, which is a high level of urea in blood. Symptoms of uremia include nausea, vomiting, fatigue, anorexia, weight loss, and change in mental status. If left untreated, uremia can lead to seizure, coma, cardiac arrest, and death.

When the body is unable to process or eliminate ammonia, such as in protein toxicity, this will lead to the build up of ammonia in the bloodstream, causing a condition called hyperammonemia. Symptoms of elevated blood ammonia include muscle weakness and fatigue. If left untreated, ammonia can cross the blood brain barrier and affect brain tissues, leading to a spectrum of neuropsychiatric and neurological symptoms including impaired memory, seizure, confusion, delirium, excessive sleepiness, disorientation, brain edema, intracranial hypertension, coma, and even death.

== Epidemiology ==
The prevalence of protein toxicity cannot be accurately quantified as there are numerous etiologies from which protein toxicity can arise.

Many people have protein toxicity as a result of chronic kidney disease (CKD) or end-stage renal disease (ESRD). The prevalence of CKD (all stages) from 1988 to 2016 in the U.S. has remained relatively consistent at about 14.2% annually. The prevalence of people who have received treatment for ESRD has increased to about 2,284 people per 1 million in 2018, up from 1927 people per 1 million in 2007. Prevalence of treated ESRD increases with age, is more prevalent in males than in females, and is higher in Native Hawaiians and Pacific Islanders over any other racial group. However, the prevalence of protein toxicity specifically is difficult to quantify as people who have diseases that cause protein metabolites to accumulate typically initiate hemodialysis before they become symptomatic.

Urea cycle disorders also cause toxic buildup of protein metabolites, namely ammonia. As of 2013, in the U.S., the incidence of urea cycle disorders has been estimated to be 1 case in every 31,000 births, resulting in about 113 new cases annually.

== Special populations ==
=== Neonates ===
Protein toxicity, specifically ammonia buildup, can affect preterm newborns that have serious defects in the urea cycle enzymes with almost no physical manifestations at birth. Clinical symptoms can manifest within a few days of birth, causing extreme illness and intellectual disability or death, if left untreated. Hyperammonemia in newborns can be diagnosed with visual cues like sepsis-like presentation, hyperventilation, fluctuating body temperature, and respiratory distress; blood panels can also be used to form differential diagnoses between hyperammonemia caused by urea cycle disorders and other disorders.

=== Neurodegenerative diseases ===
People who have neurodegenerative diseases like Huntington's disease, dementia, Parkinson's disease, and amyotrophic lateral sclerosis (ALS) also often show symptoms of protein toxicity. Cellular deficits and genetic mutations caused by these neurodegenerative diseases can pathologically alter gene transcription, negatively affecting protein metabolism.

== See also ==
- Proteopathy – damage caused by mis-folded proteins
- Hyperuricemia
