= Atrasentan =

Chemical compound

Clinical data
- Trade names: Vanrafia
- Other names: ABT-627, A-127722, atrasentan hydrochloride (USAN US)
- AHFS/Drugs.com: Monograph
- MedlinePlus: a625070
- License data: US DailyMed: Atrasentan
- Pregnancy category: Contraindicated
- Routes of administration: By mouth
- Drug class: Endothelin receptor antagonist
- ATC code: None

Legal status
- Legal status: CA: ℞-only; US: ℞-only

Identifiers
- IUPAC name: (2R,3R,4S)-4-(1,3-Benzodioxol-5-yl)-1-[2-(dibutylamino)-2-oxoethyl]-2-(4-methoxyphenyl)pyrrolidine-3-carboxylic acid
- CAS Number: 173937-91-2; as HCl: 195733-43-8
- PubChem CID: 159594; as HCl: 159595
- DrugBank: DB06199; as HCl: DBSALT001999
- ChemSpider: 140321; as HCl: 140322
- UNII: V6D7VK2215; as HCl: E4G31X93ZA
- KEGG: as HCl: D03009
- ChEBI: CHEBI:135810
- ChEMBL: ChEMBL9194; as HCl: ChEMBL2106068
- ECHA InfoCard: 100.206.784

Chemical and physical data
- Formula: C_{29}H_{38}N_{2}O_{6}
- Molar mass: 510.631 g·mol^{−1}
- 3D model (JSmol): Interactive image; as HCl: Interactive image
- SMILES: CCCCN(CCCC)C(=O)CN1C[C@@H]([C@H]([C@@H]1C2=CC=C(C=C2)OC)C(=O)O)C3=CC4=C(C=C3)OCO4; as HCl: Cl.CCCCN(CCCC)C(=O)CN1C[C@@H]([C@H]([C@@H]1C1=CC=C(OC)C=C1)C(O)=O)C1=CC=C2OCOC2=C1
- InChI: InChI=1S/C29H38N2O6/c1-4-6-14-30(15-7-5-2)26(32)18-31-17-23(21-10-13-24-25(16-21)37-19-36-24)27(29(33)34)28(31)20-8-11-22(35-3)12-9-20/h8-13,16,23,27-28H,4-7,14-15,17-19H2,1-3H3,(H,33,34)/t23-,27-,28+/m1/s1; Key:MOTJMGVDPWRKOC-QPVYNBJUSA-N; as HCl: InChI=1S/C29H38N2O6.ClH/c1-4-6-14-30(15-7-5-2)26(32)18-31-17-23(21-10-13-24-25(16-21)37-19-36-24)27(29(33)34)28(31)20-8-11-22(35-3)12-9-20;/h8-13,16,23,27-28H,4-7,14-15,17-19H2,1-3H3,(H,33,34);1H/t23-,27-,28+;/m1./s1; Key:IJFUJIFSUKPWCZ-SQMFDTLJSA-N

Atrasentan, sold under the brand name Vanrafia, is a medication used to reduce proteinuria. It is an endothelin receptor antagonist. It is taken by mouth.

Atrasentan was approved for medical use in the United States for IgA nephropathy in April 2025.

== Medical uses ==
Atrasentan is indicated to reduce proteinuria in adults with primary immunoglobulin A nephropathy at risk of rapid disease progression, generally a urine protein-to-creatinine ratio >= 1.5 g/g.

== Society and culture ==
=== Legal status ===
Atrasentan was approved for medical use in the United States in April 2025.

=== Names ===
Atrasentan is the international nonproprietary name.

Atrasentan is sold under the brand name Vanrafia.

== Research ==
=== Clinical trials ===
Atrasentan failed a phase III trial for prostate cancer in patients unresponsive to hormone therapy. A second trial confirmed this finding.

A study published in 2014 showed that 0.75 mg and 1.25 mg of atrasentan reduced urinary albumin by 35 and 38% respectively with modest side effects. Patients also had decreased home blood pressures (but no change in office readings) decrease total cholesterol and LDL. Patients in the 1.25 mg dose group had increased weight gain which was presumably due to increased edema and had to withdraw from the study more than the placebo or 0.75 mg dose group.

In 2013, the SONAR trial was initiated to determine if atrasentan reduces kidney failure in diabetic kidney disease.

In 2024, the phase III ALIGN trial found atrasentan to be effective in reducing proteinuria in participants with IgA nephropathy.

Atrasentan is being studied for the treatment of various types of cancer, including non-small-cell lung cancer. It is also being investigated as a therapy for diabetic kidney disease.

== See also ==
Sparsentan
