= Glomerular hyperfiltration =

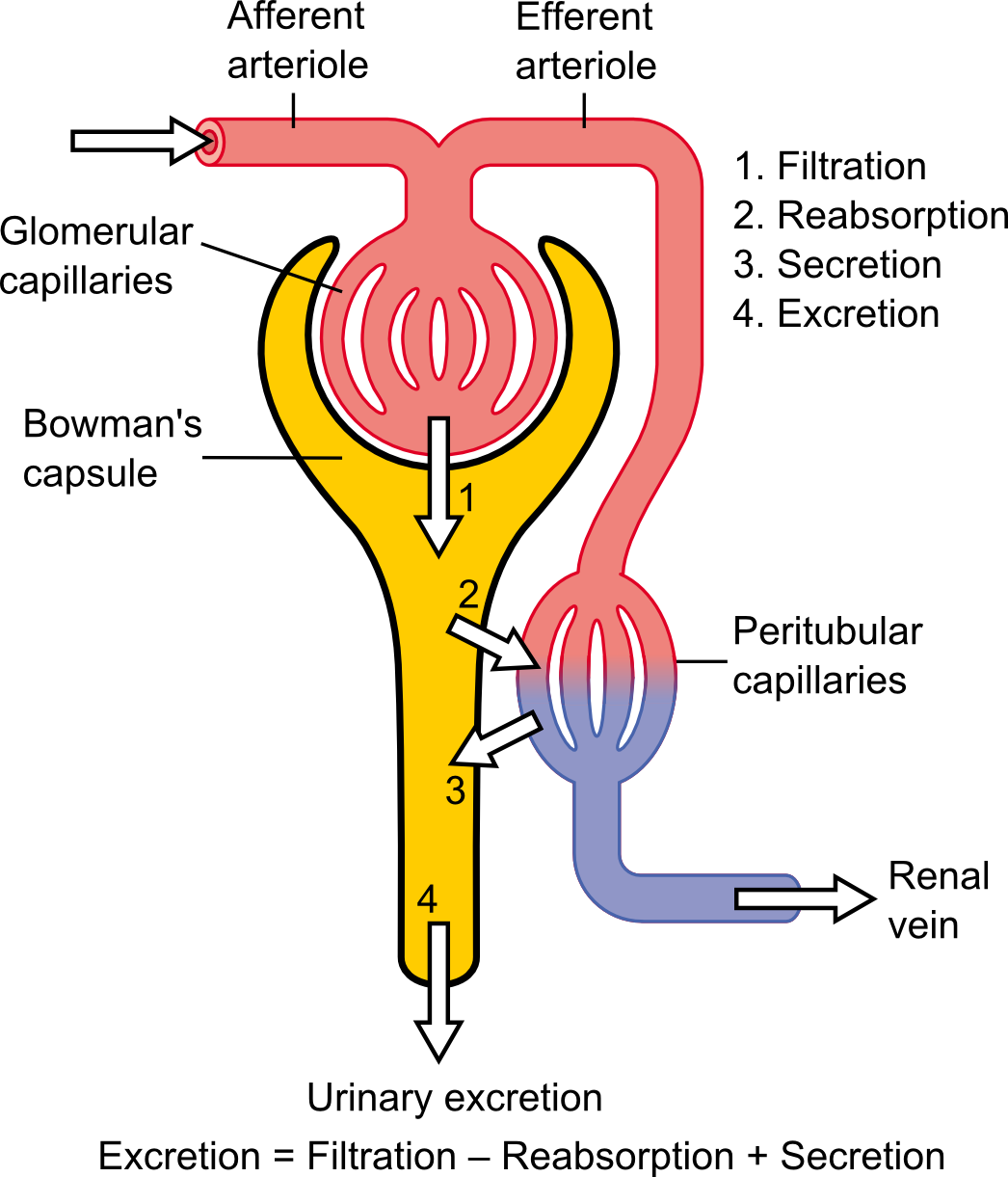
- Diagram showing a schematic nephron and its blood supply.

Glomerular hyperfiltration is a situation where the filtration elements in the kidneys called glomeruli produce excessive amounts of pro-urine. It can be part of a number of medical conditions particularly diabetic nephropathy (kidney damage associated with diabetes).

There is no universally accepted definition of glomerular hyperfiltration, and little research has been done on the pathophysiological mechanisms, which are likely to change depending on the underlying ailment.

Glomerular hyperfiltration can result from efferent arteriolar vasoconstriction due to activation of the renin–angiotensin–aldosterone system, which causes glomerular hypertension, or afferent arteriolar vasodilation, as observed in diabetic patients or following a high-protein meal.

== Causes ==
In healthy individuals, high protein loading causes glomerular hyperfiltration, or an absolute increase in glomerular filtration rate (GFR).

=== Risk factors ===
Most young Type 1 diabetic patients experience glomerular hyperfiltration, a typical functional deviation in insulin-dependent diabetes mellitus. A meta-analysis of research done on Type 1 diabetic subjects found that people with glomerular hyperfiltration have a higher chance of developing albuminuria and seeing their diabetic nephropathy worsen. Poor glycaemic control has been blamed for this finding because hyperfiltration and HbA1c were found to be correlated.

According to certain research, glomerular hyperfiltration happens in cases of hypertension as well. Humans with early-stage hypertension have demonstrated glomerular hyperfiltration during sympathetic nervous system activation.

== Mechanism ==
Activation of the renin–angiotensin–aldosterone system may be the mechanism underlying renal injury linked to glomerular hyperfiltration. This can result in endothelial dysfunction, increased arterial stiffness, and maladaptive renal and systemic hemodynamic responses.

== Diagnosis ==
The lack of an established definition for this clinical entity is one of the primary issues with the diagnosis of hyperfiltration. The primary cause of the lack of clarity surrounding the GFR levels that indicate hyperfiltration is their strong reliance on age. Glomerular hyperfiltration has traditionally been characterized as an elevated whole-kidney GFR, or a GFR greater than two standard deviations above the mean GFR of healthy individuals.

== Treatment ==
In diabetic mice, proinsulin C-peptide, a putative renoprotective agent, narrows glomerular afferent arterioles. Therefore, proinsulin C-peptide administration should theoretically prevent glomerular hyperfiltration.

An insulin-sensitizing medication called rosiglitazone is known to treat endothelial dysfunction. It has been demonstrated that this medication reduces renal end-organ damage in patients with type 2 diabetes and microalbuminuria, improves nitric oxide bioavailability, and ameliorates glomerular hyperfiltration in patients with early type 2 diabetes.

In experimental diabetes, renal nerves may play a significant role in mediating glomerular hyperfiltration. In this sense, in diabetic rats, chronic renal denervation also inhibits glomerular hyperfiltration.

== See also ==
- Glomerular filtration rate
- Renin–angiotensin system
