= Hypertensive kidney disease =

- Other names: Hypertensive nephrosclerosis (HN or HNS), hypertensive kidney disease, hypertensive nephropathy (HN), nephroangiosclerosis
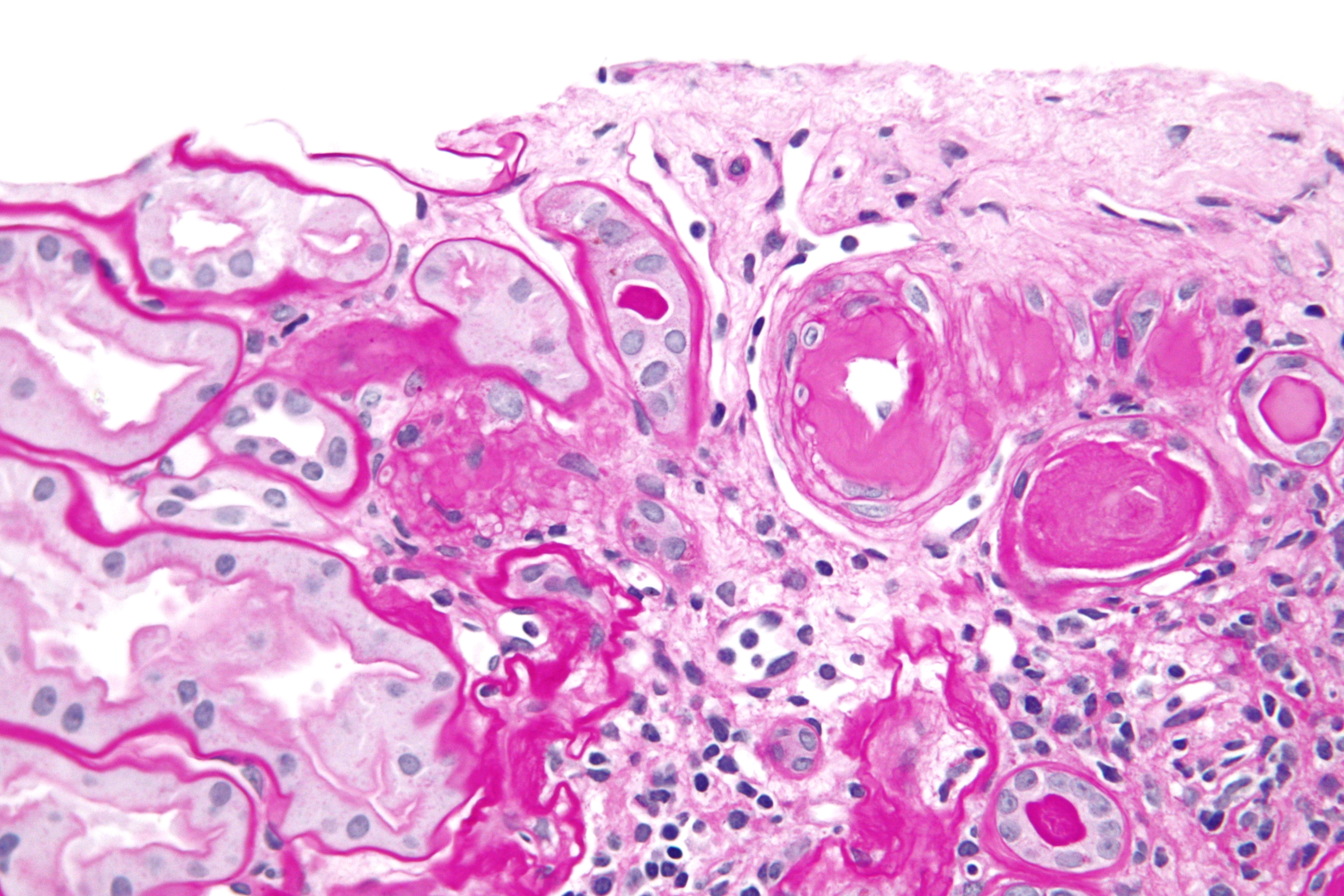
- Micrograph showing renal arterial hyalinosis – pink ring right-of-centre. PAS stain.
- Specialty: Nephrology

Hypertensive kidney disease is a medical condition referring to damage to the kidney due to chronic high blood pressure. It manifests as hypertensive nephrosclerosis (sclerosis referring to the stiffening of renal components). It should be distinguished from renovascular hypertension, which is a form of secondary hypertension, and thus has opposite direction of causation.

== Signs and symptoms ==
Signs and symptoms of chronic kidney disease, including loss of appetite, nausea, vomiting, itching, sleepiness or confusion, weight loss, and an unpleasant taste in the mouth, may develop.

== Causes ==
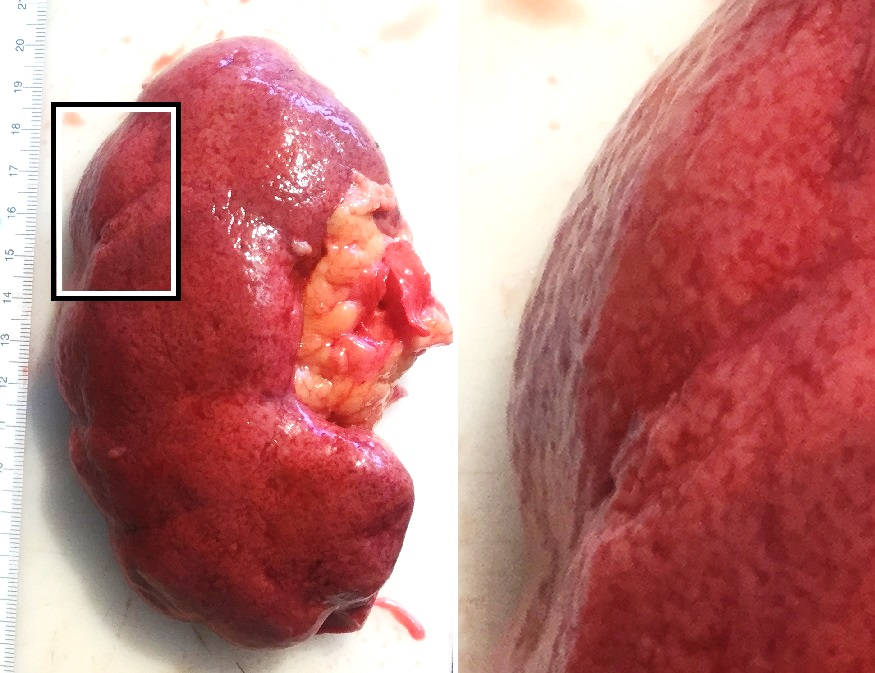
On gross pathology, nephrosclerosis manifests as a fine granular surface.

"Hypertensive" refers to high blood pressure and "nephropathy" means damage to the kidney; hence this condition is where chronic high blood pressure causes damages to kidney tissue; this includes the small blood vessels, glomeruli, kidney tubules and interstitial tissues. The tissue hardens and thickens which is known as nephrosclerosis. The narrowing of the blood vessels means less blood is going to the tissue and so less oxygen is reaching the tissue resulting in tissue death (ischemia).

Risk factors for HN include poorly controlled, moderate-to-severe hypertension, older age, other kidney disorders, and Afro-Caribbean background, whose exact cause is unclear, as it may be due to either genetic susceptibility or poor health management among people of Afro-Caribbean descent.

== Mechanism ==
In the kidneys, as a result of benign arterial hypertension, hyaline (pink, amorphous, homogeneous material) accumulates in the walls of small arteries and arterioles, producing the thickening of their walls and the narrowing of the arterial openings, a process known as arteriolosclerosis. The resulting inadequate blood flow produces tubular atrophy, interstitial fibrosis, and glomerular alterations (smaller glomeruli with different degrees of hyalinization – from mild to sclerosis of glomeruli) and scarring around the glomeruli (periglomerular fibrosis). In advanced stages, kidney failure will occur. Functional nephrons have dilated tubules, often with hyaline casts in the opening of the tubules. Additional complications often associated with hypertensive nephropathy include glomerular damage resulting in protein and blood in the urine.

Hypertensive nephropathy refers to kidney failure that can be attributed to a history of hypertension It is a chronic condition and it is a serious risk factor for the development of end-stage kidney disease (ESKD). However, despite the well-known association between hypertension and chronic kidney disease, the underlying mechanism remains unclear. The two proposed mechanisms of HN's pathophysiology both centre around how the glomerulus, a network of dense capillaries that carries out the kidney filtration process, is affected; with one theory identifying glomerular ischemia as the main contributor to HN and the other identifying glomerular hypertension and glomerular hyperfiltration at the centre of HN's pathogenesis.

=== Glomerular ischemia ===
High blood pressure in the long term can damage the endothelium, commonly known as the blood vessel lining. This leads to a build-up of plaques and they can be deposited in the renal arteries causing stenosis and ischemic kidney disease. In this situation, the kidney supplied blood by the narrowed renal artery suffers from inadequate blood flow, which in turn causes the size of the kidneys to decrease. Other consequences include arterial stiffening, which involves a gradual breakdown of elastic fibers and intima (the innermost layer of a blood vessel) thickening.

=== Glomerular hypertension and glomerular hyperfiltration ===
An alternative mechanism of hypertensive nephropathy is prolonged glomerular hypertension and hence glomerular hyperfiltration. These can occur simultaneously but not necessarily. The idea is that hypertension results in sclerosis of the glomeruli which ultimately means reduced kidney function. As a compensatory mechanism, the unaffected nephrons (specifically, the preglomerular arterioles) vasodilate to increase blood flow to the kidney perfusion and increase glomerular filtration across undamaged glomeruli.

== Diagnosis ==
Diagnosis of HN is made from clinical history and biochemical investigations. Chronic hypertension with progressive kidney disease progresses over a long period of time. Damage to the glomeruli allows proteins that are usually too large to pass into the nephron to be filtered. This leads to an elevated concentration of albumin in the urine (albuminuria). This albuminuria usually does not cause symptoms but can be indicative of many kidney disorders. Protein in the urine (proteinuria) is best identified from a 24-hour urine collection.

Bilateral renal artery stenosis should always be considered as a differential diagnosis for the presentation of HN. Kidney disease with this etiology can potentially be reversed following vascular intervention.

=== Histology ===
In benign nephrosclerosis, the changes occurring are gradual and progressive, however, there can be sufficient kidney reserve capacity to maintain adequate kidney function for many years. The large renal arteries exhibit intimal thickening, medial hypertrophy, duplication of the elastic layer. The changes in small arterioles include hyaline arteriolosclerosis (deposition of hyaline, collagenous material), which causes glomerular collapse (wrinkling and thickening of capillary basement membranes and collapse of capillary lumen) and solidification (glomeruli exhibit sclerosis and increase in mesangial matrix). The degree of scarring correlates with the degree of glomerular filtration deficit.

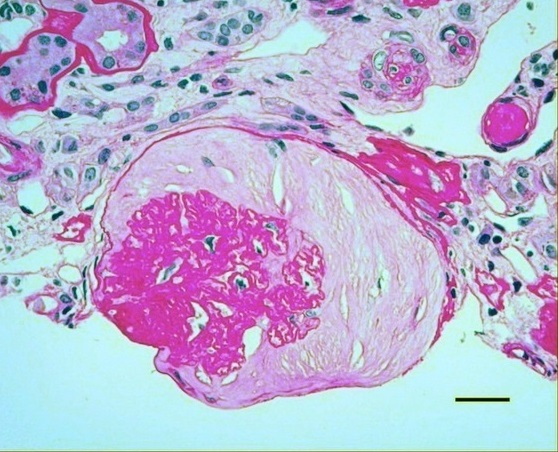
Light micrograph showing hypertensive glomerular lesion of hypertensive nephropathy: global glomerular collapse and filling of Bowman's space with a lightly staining collagenous material.

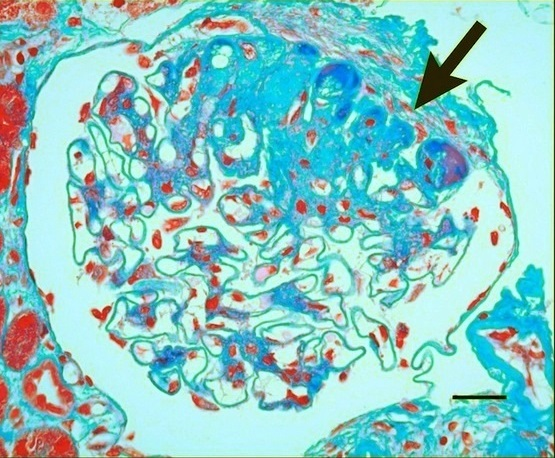
Light micrograph of glomerulus showing secondary segmental sclerosis of hypertensive nephropathy.

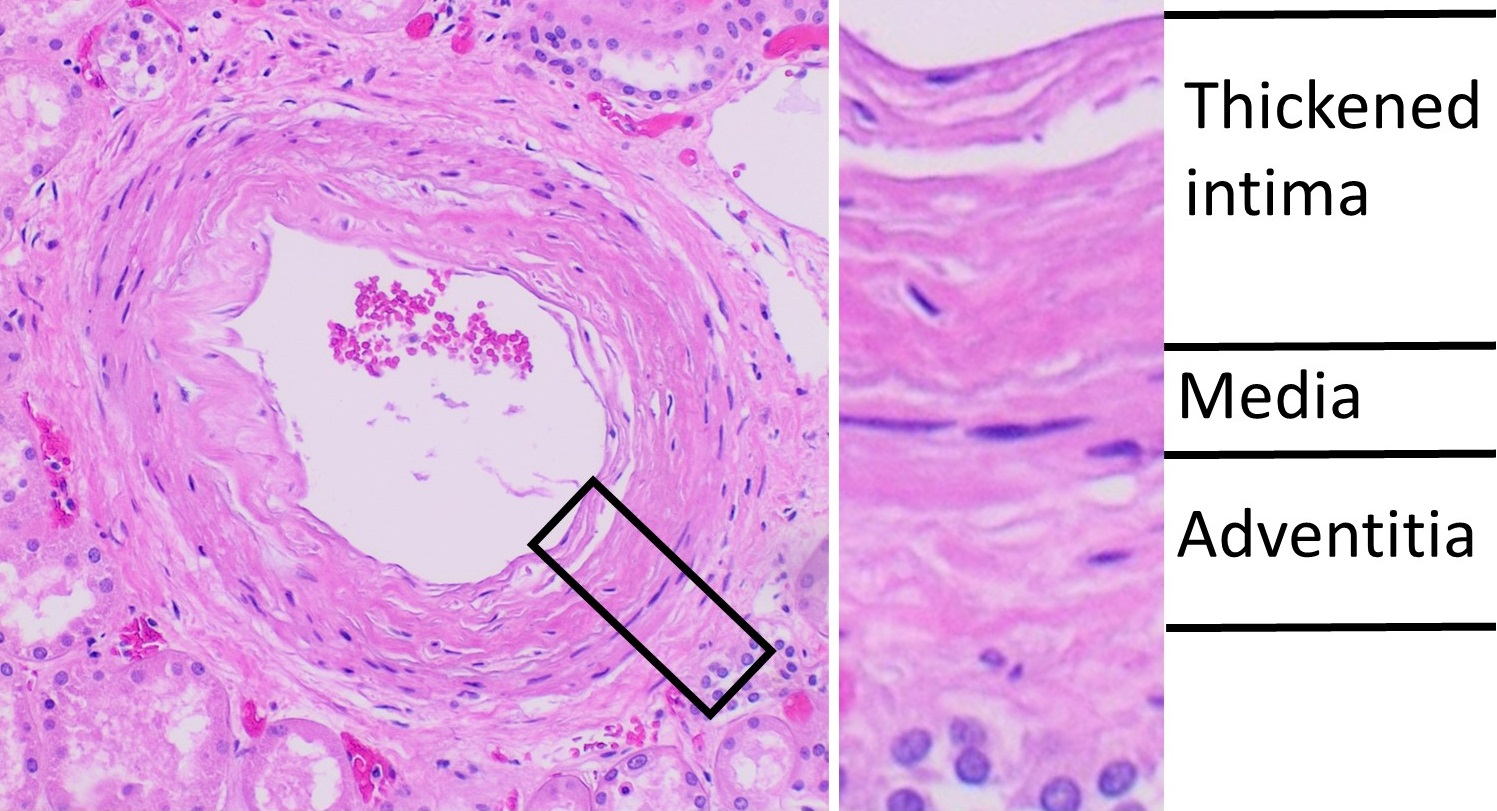
Histopathology of arcuate artery nephrosclerosis, seen as a thickened intima with an onion skin-like architecture. It is presumably a manifestation of hypertensive kidney disease.

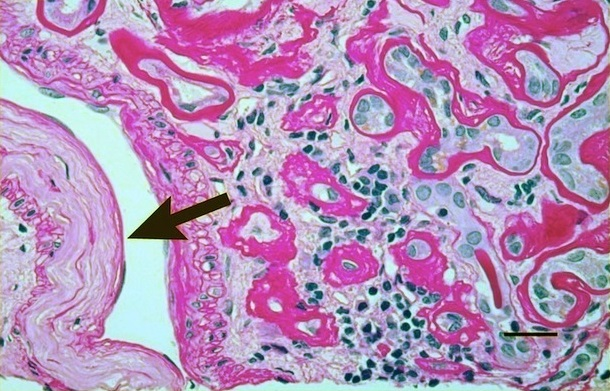
Light micrograph showing signs of hypertensive nephropathy: interstitial fibrosis, tubular atrophy with thickened tubular basement membranes, and fibrous intimal thickening of a small artery (arrow).

Malignant nephrosclerosis is where hypertensive nephrosclerosis occurs in presence of malignant hypertension (when DBP > 130mmHg). Vessels feature intimal thickening, fibrinoid necrosis, red blood cell fragmentation, extravasation, thrombosis. These changes create an exaggerated layered appearance (onion skinning).

=== Urine test ===
Microalbuminuria (moderate increase in the levels of urinary albumin) is a non-specific finding in patients with vascular disease that is associated with increased risk of cardiovascular events. The majority of patients with benign nephrosclerosis have proteinuria in the range from 0.5 to 1 g/ 24hr. In the case of glomerular damage occurring in HN, hematuria can occur as well.

=== Definitive diagnosis ===
The definitive diagnosis of HN requires morphological examination. Common histological features can be identified in the renal and glomerular vasculature. Glomerulosclerosis is often present, either focally or globally, which is characterized by hardening of the vessel walls. Also, luminal narrowing of the arteries and arterioles of the kidney system. However, this type of procedure is likely to be preceded by a provisional diagnosis based on laboratory investigations.

=== Future diagnostic approaches ===
Increasing access to, and use of, genome profiling may provide opportunity for diagnosis based on presentation and genetic risk factors, by identifying ApoL1 gene variants on chromosome 22.

== Management ==
The aim of the medical treatment is to slow the progression of chronic kidney disease by reducing blood pressure and albumin levels. The current published guidelines define ideal BP of <130/80 mmHg for patients with hypertensive nephropathy; studies show that anything higher or lower than this can increase cardiovascular risk. According to the African American Study of Kidney Disease (AASK) trial, after an additional 5 years follow-up upon completion of the 10-year trial, up to 65% of the cohort had progressive nephropathy despite having controlled the mean systolic BP level <135 mmHg.

ACE inhibitors, angiotensin receptor blockers, direct renin inhibitors and aldosterone antagonists, are pharmacological treatments that can be used to lower BP to target levels; hence reducing neuropathy and proteinuria progression. The management plan should be individualized based on the condition of the patients including comorbidities and previous medical history. In addition, there are lifestyle changes that can be made. Weight reduction, exercise, reducing salt intake can be done to manage hypertensive nephropathy.

== Prognosis ==
According to the United States Renal Data System (USRDS), hypertensive nephropathy accounts for more than one-third of patients on hemodialysis and the annual mortality rate for patients on hemodialysis is 23.3%. Haemodialysis is recommended for patients who progress to end-stage kidney disease (ESKD) and hypertensive nephropathy is the second most common cause of ESKD after diabetes. Patient prognosis is dependent on numerous factors including age, ethnicity, blood pressure and glomerular filtration rate. Changes in lifestyle factors, such as reduced salt intake and increased physical activity have been shown to improve outcomes but are insufficient without pharmacological treatment.

== Epidemiology ==
The incidence of hypertensive nephropathy varies around the world. For instance, it accounts for as many as 25% and 17% of patients starting dialysis for end-stage kidney disease in Italy and France respectively. Contrastingly, Japan and China report only 6 and 7% respectively. Since the year 2000, nephropathy caused by hypertension has increased in incidence by 8.7% In reality, these figures may be even higher, as hypertension is not always reported as the specific cause of kidney disease.

It has been recognized that the incidence of hypertensive nephropathy varies with ethnicity. Compared to Caucasians, African Americans in the USA are much more likely to develop hypertensive nephropathy. Of those who do, the proportion who then go on to develop end-stage kidney failure is 3.5 times higher than in the Caucasian population. In addition to this, African Americans tend to develop hypertensive nephropathy at a younger age than Caucasians (45 to 65, compared to >65).

== See also ==
- Nephropathy
