= Diabetic nephropathy =

Chronic loss of kidney function

- Other names: Diabetic kidney disease
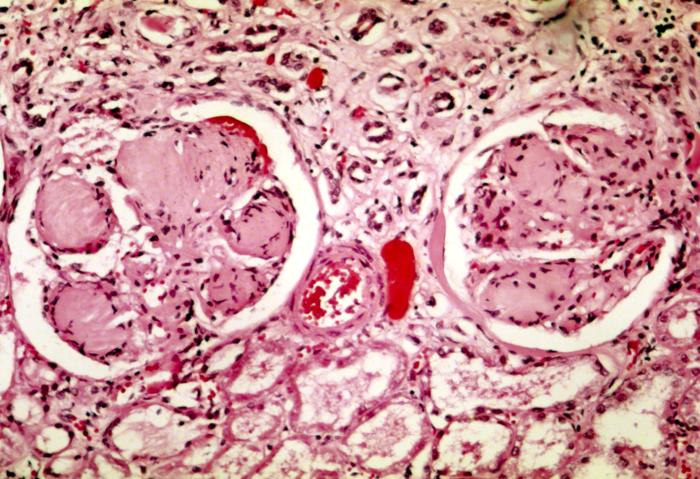
- Two glomeruli in diabetic nephropathy: the acellular light purple areas within the capillary tufts are the destructive mesangial matrix deposits.
- Specialty: Nephrology, endocrinology
- Symptoms: Albuminuria, peripheral edema, high blood pressure, tiredness
- Risk factors: High blood pressure, tobacco smoking, unstable blood glucose
- Diagnostic method: Abnormal levels of urinary albumin
- Prevention: Smoking cessation
- Treatment: ACE inhibitors

Diabetic nephropathy (DN), also known as diabetic kidney disease (DKD), is a chronic loss of kidney function in those with diabetes mellitus (diabetes), affecting approximately one quarter of adults with diabetes in the United States. DN is the leading cause of chronic kidney disease (CKD) and end-stage kidney disease (ESKD) worldwide. The condition is commonly associated with proteinuria (protein in the urine), hypertension, and declining renal function over time.

Affected individuals with ESKD often require hemodialysis and eventually kidney transplantation to replace the failed kidney function. DN is associated with an increased risk of death in general, particularly from cardiovascular disease.

== Signs and symptoms ==
DN is usually asymptomatic in the early stages, with onset of symptoms appear 5 to 10 years after the disease begins.

Peripheral edema is often the first symptom patients notice, usually indicating advanced disease. Other symptoms include tiredness, headaches, a general feeling of illness, nausea, vomiting, lack of appetite, and itchy skin.

== Risk factors ==
Not all patients with diabetes go on to develop DN. The main risk factors that increase the likelihood of developing DN are:

- Poor control of blood glucose
- Uncontrolled high blood pressure
- Type 1 diabetes mellitus, with onset before age 20
- Past or current cigarette use
- A family history of DN (certain genes have been identified that are associated with DN. However, no direct correlation has been established yet. One of these genes is APOL1, which has been found to be associated with nephropathy in African American individuals.)
- Certain racial groups (African Americans, Mexican Americans, and Pima Indians are at higher risk).

== Pathophysiology ==
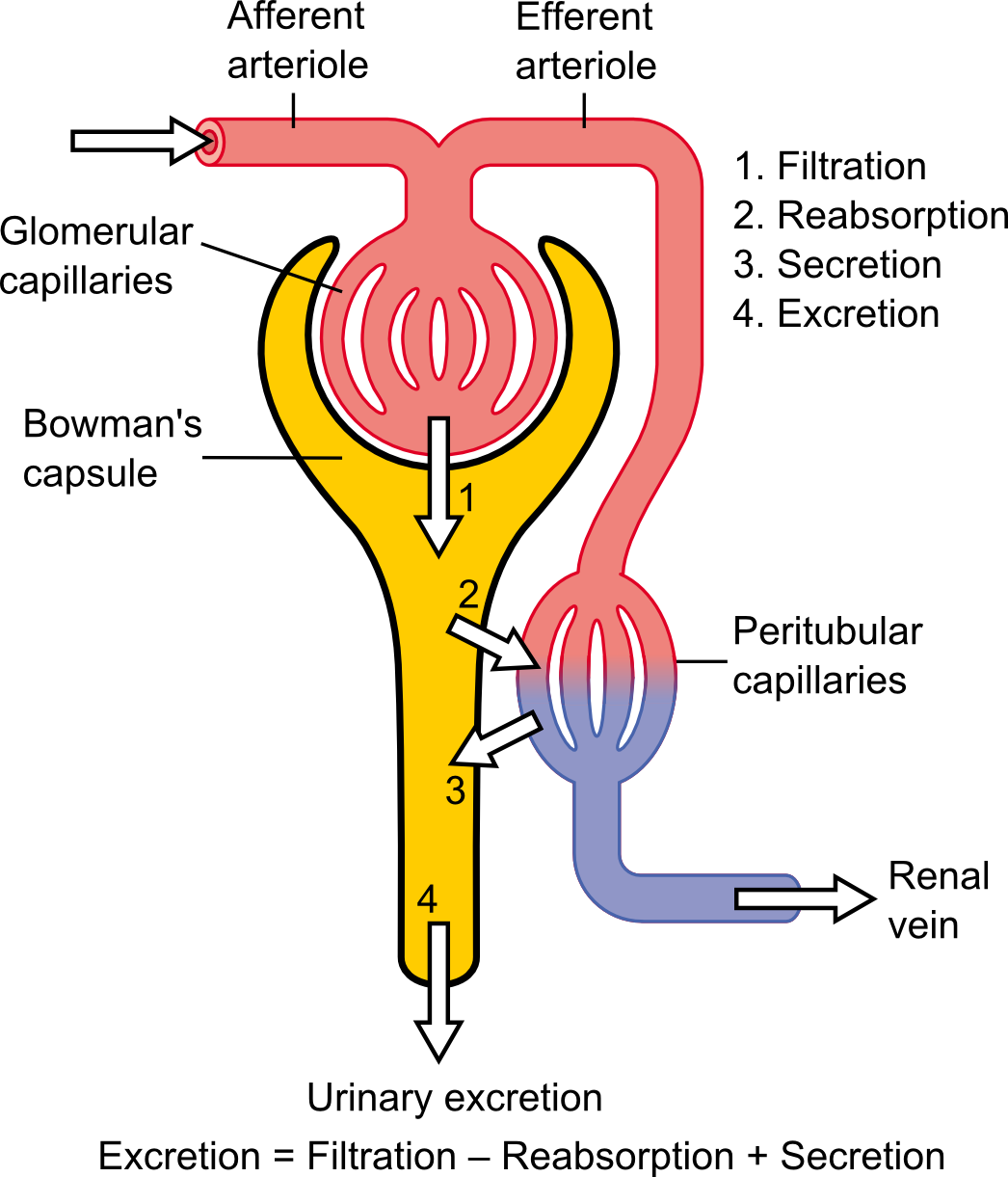
Diagram showing the basic outline of nephron structure and function: diabetic nephropathy is associated with changes in the afferent and efferent arterioles, causing capillary hypertension; and damage to the glomerular capillaries of multiple causes, including mesangial matrix deposition

The disease progression of DN involves various clinical stages: hyperfiltration, microalbuminuria, macroalbuminuria, nephrotic proteinuria to progressive chronic kidney disease leading to ESKD. The damage is exerted on all compartments of the kidney: the glomerulus, the renal tubules, the vasculature (afferent and efferent renal arterioles) and the interstitium. Renal fibrosis is the final common pathway of DN. This fibrosis is a product of multiple mechanisms including renal hemodynamic changes, glucose metabolism abnormalities associated with oxidative stress as well as inflammatory processes and an overactive renin-angiotensin-aldosterone system (RAAS).

The pathophysiology of DN is thought to involve an interaction between hemodynamic and metabolic factors.

Hemodynamic factors include an increase in systemic and intraglomerular pressure, as well as the over-activation of the RAAS. Studies have shown that in the setting of diabetes, various factors stimulate the RAAS, which is one of the most important pathways in DN pathophysiology. Due to the higher load of filtered glucose, there is an up-regulation in the sodium-glucose cotransporter 2 (SGLT2) in the proximal tubules, which cotransports sodium and glucose back into circulation. This leads to a decrease in the delivery of sodium chloride to the macula densa in the distal tubules, promoting the release of renin and over-activating RAAS.

Hyperfiltration is one of the earliest features of DN. Several mechanisms have been proposed to cause hyperfiltration. One of these mechanisms is that as glomeruli becomes hypertrophied, filtration surface area initially increases. Another possible mechanism is that abnormal vascular control in diabetic nephropathy leads to a reduction in afferent glomerular arteriolar resistance and an increase in efferent glomerular arteriolar resistance, leading to a net increase in renal blood flow (RBF) and glomerular filtration rate (GFR). Glomerular hyperfiltration and an aberrant regulation of RAAS lead to increased intraglomerular pressure, causing stress on the endothelial cells, the mesangial cells and the podocytes. This exacerbates the dysfunction caused by the metabolic effects of hyperglycemia.

Metabolic factors include the formation of advanced glycation end-products (AGEs), which have a central role in the pathophysiology of many of the complications of diabetes mellitus, including cardiovascular complications. AGEs are chemical groups that form when a reducing sugar (glucose in this case) reacts non-enzymatically with an amine group, predominantly lysine and arginine, which are attached on proteins, lipids and nucleic acids. These glycation products accumulate on the proteins of vessel wall collagen, forming an irreversible complex of cross-linked AGEs. An important way AGEs exert their effect is through a receptor-mediated mechanism, most importantly by the receptor for advanced glycation end products (RAGE). RAGE is a signal transduction receptor found on a number of cell types including macrophages, endothelial cells, renal mesangial cells and podocytes in the glomerulus. Bindings of AGEs to RAGE receptors enhances production of cytosolic Reactive Oxygen Species (ROS) as well as stimulates intracellular molecules such as Protein Kinase C (PKC), NF-κB and the activation of growth factors TGF-B and vascular endothelial growth factor (VEGF). These factors, along with the hemodynamic changes that occur, lead to podocyte injury, oxidative stress, inflammation and fibrosis. As injury worsens, kidney function decreases and glomerular basement membrane (GBM) become more permeable and less efficient at filtration. This is accompanied by a steady decline in kidney function.

== Diagnosis ==
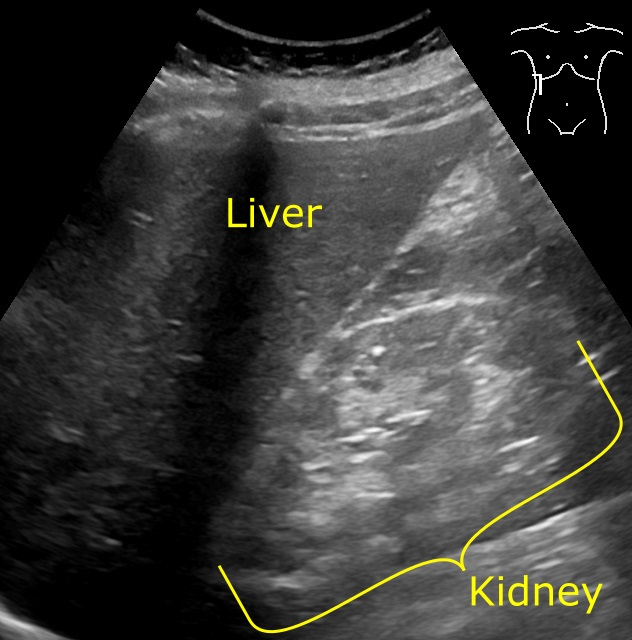
Ultrasonography showing hyperechogenicity of the renal cortex, visualized in the image as brighter than the liver.

Diagnosis is based on the measurement of abnormal levels of urinary albumin in an individual with diabetes coupled with exclusion of other causes of albuminuria. Albumin measurements are defined as follows:

- Normal albuminuria: urinary albumin excretion <30 mg/24h;
- Microalbuminuria: urinary albumin excretion in the range of 30–299 mg/24h;
- Macroalbuminuria: urinary albumin excretion ≥300 mg/24h
Urinary albumin excretion can also be measured by urinary albumin/creatinine ratio in a spot urine sample, which is as accurate but more convenient than a 24-hour urine collection.

It is recommended that individuals with diabetes have their albumin levels checked annually, beginning immediately after a diagnosis of type 2 diabetes and five years after a diagnosis of type 1 diabetes. Medical imaging of the kidneys, generally by ultrasonography, is recommended as part of a differential diagnosis if there is suspicion of urinary tract obstruction, urinary tract infection, kidney stones or polycystic kidney disease. Confirmation kidney biopsy should only be performed if non-diabetic kidney disease is suspected.

Urine analysis in patients with diabetic kidney disease is often bland. In cases of severely increased microalbuminuria, hematuria might be present. Fat bodies might be present in patients who develop nephrotic-range proteinuria.

Clinical staging
| CKD Stage | eGFR level (mL/min/1.73 m^{2}) |
|---|---|
| Stage 1 | ≥ 90 |
| Stage 2 | 60–89 |
| Stage 3 | 30–59 |
| Stage 4 | 15–29 |
| Stage 5 | < 15 |

=== Staging ===
To clinically stage the degree of damage in this (and any) kidney disease, the serum creatinine is determined and used to calculate the estimated glomerular filtration rate (eGFR). Normal eGFR is equal to or greater than 90ml/min/1.73 m^{2}. On biopsy, the following classification has been suggested by Tervaert et al.:

Histopathologic staging
| Class | Description and criteria |
|---|---|
| I | Mild or nonspecific changes on light microscopy and conformed GBM thickening proven by electron microscopy: GBM > 395 nm (female), GBM > 430 nm (male). |
| IIa | Mild mesangial expansion in >25% of the observed mesangium.; Area of mesangial proliferation < area of capillary cavity. |
| IIb | Severe mesangial expansion in >25% of the observed mesangium.; Area of mesangial proliferation < area of capillary cavity. |
| III | At least one convincing nodular sclerosis (Kimmelstiel-Wilson lesion). |
| IV | Advanced diabetic glomerulosclerosis in >50% of glomeruli. |

=== Biomarkers ===
Although albuminuria is the most frequently used marker of DN, it has a limited sensitivity as many patients with diabetic nephropathy experience GFR loss and glomerulosclerosis without immediate elevation in albuminuria. The eGFR may progressively fall from a normal of over 90 ml/min/1.73m^{2} to less than 15, at which point the patient is said to have end-stage renal disease.

Many novel markers are currently being studied that potentially detect diabetic nephropathy at earlier stages and identify progression risk. Cystatin C is a protein that is freely filtered in the glomeruli before it is reabsorbed and catabolized in the renal tubular cells. Its serum level is independent of muscle mass, making more accurate at estimating GFR than creatinine serum levels.

== Treatment ==
The goals of treatment are to slow the progression of kidney damage and control related complications. Management of diabetic nephropathy currently centers over four main areas: Cardiovascular risk reduction, glycemic control, blood pressure control as well as inhibition of the RAAS system.

Cardiovascular risk reduction: Patients with diabetes mellitus are at significantly increased risk of cardiovascular disease, which is also an independent risk factor for kidney failure. Therefore, it is important to aggressively manage cardiovascular risk factors in patients with diabetes mellitus and in particular those with diabetic nephropathy. The main components of managing cardiovascular disease is with tobacco cessation, lipid-lowering therapies (e.g., statins) as well as regular exercise and healthy eating. In patients with kidney disease, atorvastatin is preferred over other statins as it does not require dose-adjustment based on GFR.

Glycemic control: Multiple studies have found a positive effect of improved glycemic control on clinical outcomes of patients with diabetic nephropathy. Intensive glycemic control also reduces the rate of other DM complications, such as retinopathy and neuropathy. Glycemic control is maintained mainly with insulin in patients with Type 1 DM and with hypoglycemic agents and/or insulin in patients with type 2 DM. Studies showed a decrease in microvascular complications of diabetic nephropathy with a target goal HbA1c concentration of 7%. Further reduction in the HbA1c did not correlate with better outcomes and is thus not recommended in most patients as it could increase the risk of hypoglycemic episodes.

Blood pressure control: Multiple randomized clinical trials have demonstrated a benefit of decreasing systolic blood pressure to <140 mmHg in patients with diabetic nephropathy. High blood pressure is associated with accelerated development of microalbuminuria, over proteinuria and declining kidney function. Angiotensin-converting-enzyme inhibitors, as well as angiotensin II receptor blockers, are particularly helpful in patients with diabetes to lower blood pressure and slow the progression of nephropathy. More intensive blood pressure lowering (125-130/<80) in patients with diabetic mellitus has been shown to decrease the risk of progression of diabetic nephropathy as well as other diabetic complications. Some patients might require dual therapy to adequately control pressure, in which case calcium channel blockers or diuretics are a good second-line option.

RAAS inhibition: Inhibition can be achieved with multiple therapies, mainly ACE inhibitors, angiotensin receptor blockers, direct renin inhibitors, and mineralocorticoid antagonists. RAAS inhibition has been proven to be the most effective therapy to slow the progression of diabetic nephropathy in all stages. Although RAAS blockade using more than one agent may further reduce proteinuria, the risk of adverse events (such as hyperkalemia, acute kidney injury) outweigh the potential benefits. Therefore, it is recommended that only one agent is used in patients with DM who have hypertension or any signs of microalbuminuria or diabetic nephropathy.

About half of insulin is metabolized and cleared by the kidneys. This means that as kidney function worsens in the setting of DN, some patients with insulin-dependent DM may find that their regular insulin doses are lasting longer than normal, or that they are experiencing an increasing frequency of hypoglycemic episodes. It is also crucial to closely monitor kidney function to properly dose medications that are cleared by the kidneys. Some of the most commonly used nephrotoxic medications are non-steroidal anti-inflammatory drugs (NSAIDs) such as ibuprofen. With worsening kidney function, it might also be necessary to follow a renal-diet to avoid complications such as hyperkalemia and metabolic acidosis. Some evidence suggests that limiting dietary protein could slow the progression of DN, but further evidence is needed to confirm this benefit. Patients with diabetic nephropathy might go on to develop end stage renal disease and require kidney transplantation or hemodialysis.

=== Emerging therapies ===
A relatively new medication that has been approved for treatment for DM is sodium glucose cotransporter 2 (SGLT2) inhibitors. The mechanism of action of this drug is to the sodium-glucose uptake cotransporter in the proximal tubule, thereby generating natriuresis and glucosuria. In multiple clinical trials, SGLT2 inhibitors showed improved cardiovascular outcomes in patients with DM as well a positive effect on kidney outcomes, mainly a reduction in albuminuria and progression of renal damage. Other classes of diabetic medications that have been shown to have a positive effect on the progression of diabetic nephropathy are GLP-1 agonists and DPP-4 inhibitors.

=== Education and self-management ===
The success of diabetic nephropathy management depends greatly upon the ability of individuals to self-manage this condition, encompassing glycaemic control, and the adoption of healthy lifestyles. Appropriate self-management often requires patient education and behavioural counselling. A systematic review (updated in 2024) has found that education programs probably improve knowledge in some areas related to diabetes care and self-management, and lower HbA1c in people with chronic kidney disease and diabetes. Their impact on other clinical outcomes, however, remains unclear and further study is needed.

== Prognosis ==
Diabetic nephropathy in type 2 diabetes can be more difficult to predict because the onset of diabetes is not usually well established. Without intervention, 20–40 percent of patients with type 2 diabetes/microalbuminuria, will evolve to macroalbuminuria. Diabetic nephropathy is the most common cause of end-stage kidney disease, which may require hemodialysis or even kidney transplantation. It is associated with an increased risk of death in general, particularly from cardiovascular disease.

== Epidemiology ==
Diabetic nephropathy affects approximately a third of patients with type 1 and type 2 diabetes mellitus. Diabetic nephropathy is responsible for about a third of cases of ESRD worldwide, and an even larger fraction in the developed countries. Worldwide, the prevalence of diabetes is projected to increase from 382 million in 2013, to over 592 million by 2035. This increase is projected to be sharpest in developed countries. The prevalence of type 2 DM is particularly increasing due to the rising prevalence of obesity worldwide. Diabetic kidney disease progression could lead to ESRD as well as an increased risk of cardiovascular complications, all of which cause a substantial economic burden. The estimated cost of management of patients with ESRD due to diabetic nephropathy in the US is US$39.35 billion in 2010. Within developed countries, certain ethnic groups such as African Americans and Native Americans are at higher risk of developing diabetic nephropathy and ESRD.

== See also ==
- Diabetic diet
- Hyperbaric medicine
- Nephrology
