= Edmund Randerath =

Edmund Randerath (18 March 1899 – 19 March 1961) was a German nephropathologist who worked at the University of Heidelberg after World War II. Prior to that he conducted studies during the Nazi era and had been exonerated for his Nazi period activities. Randerath produced the first experimental evidence to support the idea that proteinuria was due to degeneration of the glomeruli.

== Life and work ==
Randerath was born in Düsseldorf, the son of school principal. During World War I he enlisted and served on the French frontier and received an Iron Cross 1st and 2nd Class medal. In 1919 he studied medicine at the Universities of Marburg and Düsseldorf, and received a doctorate from Cologne. He continued academic research in 1924 under Paul Hübschmann in Düsseldorf and wrote his habilitation thesis on skeletal tuberculosis (1932). In 1920 he served in the Freikorps fighting the Spartacists in Berlin.

During the Third Reich, Randerath became a member of the Sanitätskorps Wehrmacht Heer (Army Medical Service of the Wehrmacht). He was a member of several other organizations with the Nazi regime and was a part of the "Amt für Wissenschaft" (Office of Science) at the Medical Academy Düsseldorf. In 1937, Randerath became a member of the Nazi Party after a ban on new membership was relaxed. In 1939 he was considered for a professor position in Posen and for a proposed university in Krakow. The war however interrupted it and he served as a pathologist on the Eastern Front. He studied typhus as well as nephropathology. Randerath took part in the medical conferences held at the Military Medical Academy in Berlin which included presentations on experiments conducted on prisoners in concentration camps. Randerath worked on kidney damage caused by typhus and sulfonamides and presented on the topic. Some sulfonamide tests had been carried out at the Ravensbrück concentration camp. He also worked on typhus, making use of autopsies on dead army personnel in Russia. In 1944, Randerath was appointed to the Military Medical Academy in Berlin as a deputy director for the institute for general and military pathology. In April 1944 he was promoted to Oberfeldarzt and he was taken prisoner by the US Army on 15 April 1945.

During the denazification process, Randerath argued that his Nazi membership was merely a formality for him to continue working, and that he did not know about the existence of concentration camps. He was initially removed from his position as a lecturer in Düsseldorf in early 1946, but his case was revisited later that year. He brought forth more testimonies, including that he worked with a technical assistant who was previously married to a Jew and had two half Jewish children. In September of 1946, he was recommended for reinstatement, and by 1948, he was exonerated. During these procedures, Randerath continued advancing in his career. He joined the University of Göttingen in 1946, where he succeeded Georg Benno Gruber as a full professor the very next year. In 1949, he became full professor and director of the Institute of Pathology at the University of Heidelberg, working on tuberculosis and nephropathology. In 1956, he served as rector at the university.

Randerath's first major work was on skeletal tuberculosis which was based on the use of Thorotrast which led him to examine the fate of the thorium tracers. This led him to examine glomerular podocytes and capsular epithelial cells. He became interested in Bence Jones proteinuria. Nephrosis was considered to be caused by the nephron but Randerath suspected the glomeruli as the cause. Randerath conducted experiments in salamanders in 1938 by injecting the coelomic cavity with bovine serum, human serum, and serum from human patients with renal disease. His student Arno Hein conducted the experiments and published the results. He noted that the proteins were taken in by those glomeruli having a connection to the coelomic cavity and not by closed nephrons. Randerath's works had reduced influence due to post-war inhibitions towards German scientists by the wider scientific community and due to his works being published in German.
