= Ureterocutaneostomy =

- Specialty: Urology

Ureterocutaneostomy is a type of incontinent, cutaneous urinary diversion. It provides a basic urinary diversion for preventing ureteral obstruction. Ureterocutaneostomy is usually preferred in infants/children as a temporary diversion whose metabolic status is inadequate for reconstructive surgery or palliative care of bladder carcinoma patients. Main surgical technique involves dissection of ureter/ureters and creating a terminal or loop stoma to skin using ureter lumen. In case of bilateral obstruction, two ureter lumens can be connected using transureteroureterostomy technique or two separate stomas can be created.
