= IgM nephropathy =

- Other names: immunoglobulin M nephropathy (IgMN)
- Antibody type IgM scheme. Blue - heavy chains, Yellow — light chains, Dark yellow/blue — variable regions (ends are binding sites), Light yellow/blue — constant regions, Green — disulfide bridges, Black — J chain
- Specialty: Nephrology

IgM nephropathy or immunoglobulin M nephropathy (IgMN) is a kind of idiopathic glomerulonephritis that is marked by IgM diffuse deposits in the glomerular mesangium. IgM nephropathy was initially documented in 1978 by two separate teams of researchers.

== Signs and symptoms ==
Young adults or children with IgM nephropathy typically exhibit proteinuria or hematuria. In people with IgMN, proteinuria can vary from nephrotic syndrome to asymptomatic proteinuria.

== Causes ==
The cause of IgM nephropathy is unknown. Several systemic illnesses, including paraproteinemia, diabetes mellitus, rheumatoid arthritis, systemic lupus erythematosus (SLE), and Alport's syndrome, can cause IgM deposits in the glomeruli.

== Mechanism ==
It is yet unknown how IgM nephropathy develops, however it has been proposed that aberrant T-cell activity or a disruption in mesangial cell immunoaggregate clearance may be involved. Several investigations have found that patients with IgM nephropathy have higher blood IgM or IgM immunocomplex concentrations, which would provide support to the previously indicated idea.

== Diagnosis ==
Light microscopy (LM) on a renal sample reveals variable degrees of mesangial cell proliferation or mesangial sclerosis from minute alterations. A small number of instances with crescentic glomerulonephritis (GN) have been documented. Immunofluorescence (IF) analysis of kidney biopsy specimens shows that IgM deposits in the mesangium have a granular or diffuse appearance. While there may be traces of other immunoglobulins besides IgM, significant IgM deposition is typically indicative. Certain investigations have also revealed the existence of complement fragments, such as C3 or C1q.

== See also ==
- Glomerulonephritis
- IgA nephropathy
