= Arteriolosclerosis =

Hardening of small arteries (arterioles)

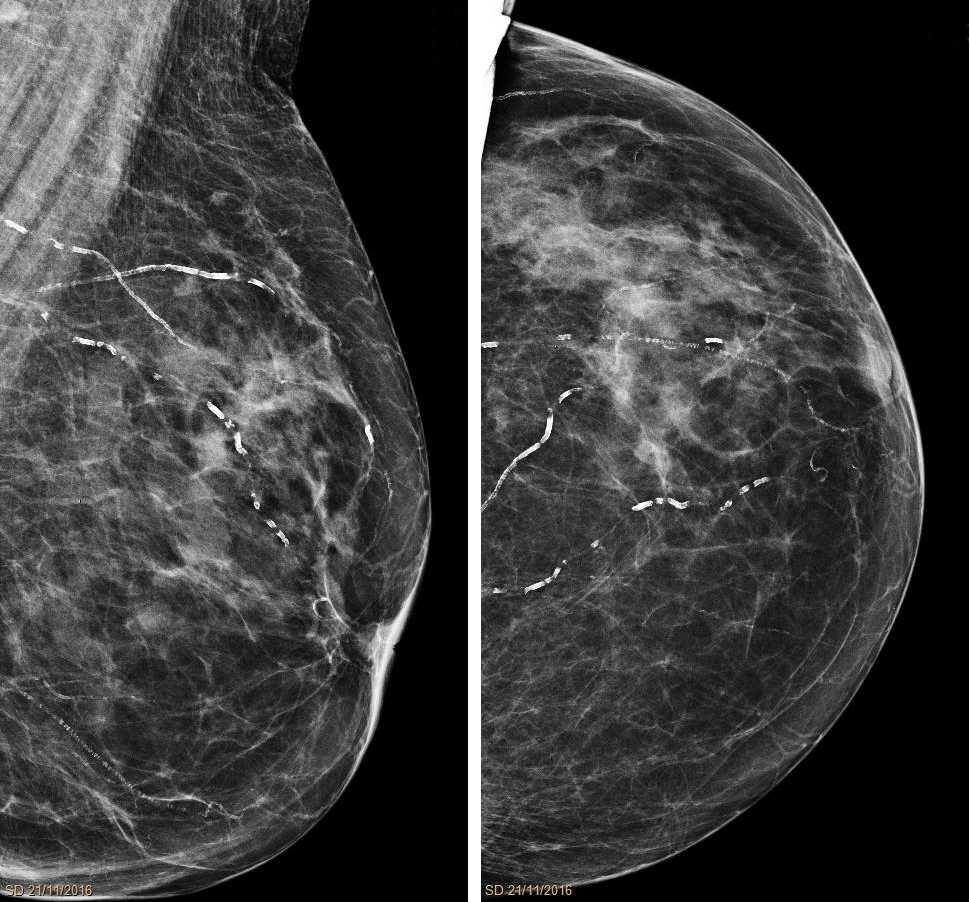
- Right breast mammograms showing several calcified arterioles. Patient 94 years old.
- Specialty: Cardiology

Arteriolosclerosis is a form of cardiovascular disease involving hardening and loss of elasticity of arterioles or small arteries and is most often associated with hypertension and diabetes mellitus. Types include hyaline arteriolosclerosis and hyperplastic arteriolosclerosis, both involved with vessel wall thickening and luminal narrowing that may cause downstream ischemic injury. The following two terms whilst similar, are distinct in both spelling and meaning and may easily be confused with arteriolosclerosis.

- Arteriosclerosis is any hardening (and loss of elasticity) of medium or large arteries (from the Greek arteria, meaning artery, and sclerosis, meaning hardening)
- Atherosclerosis is a hardening of an artery specifically due to an atheromatous plaque. The term atherogenic is used for substances or processes that cause atherosclerosis.

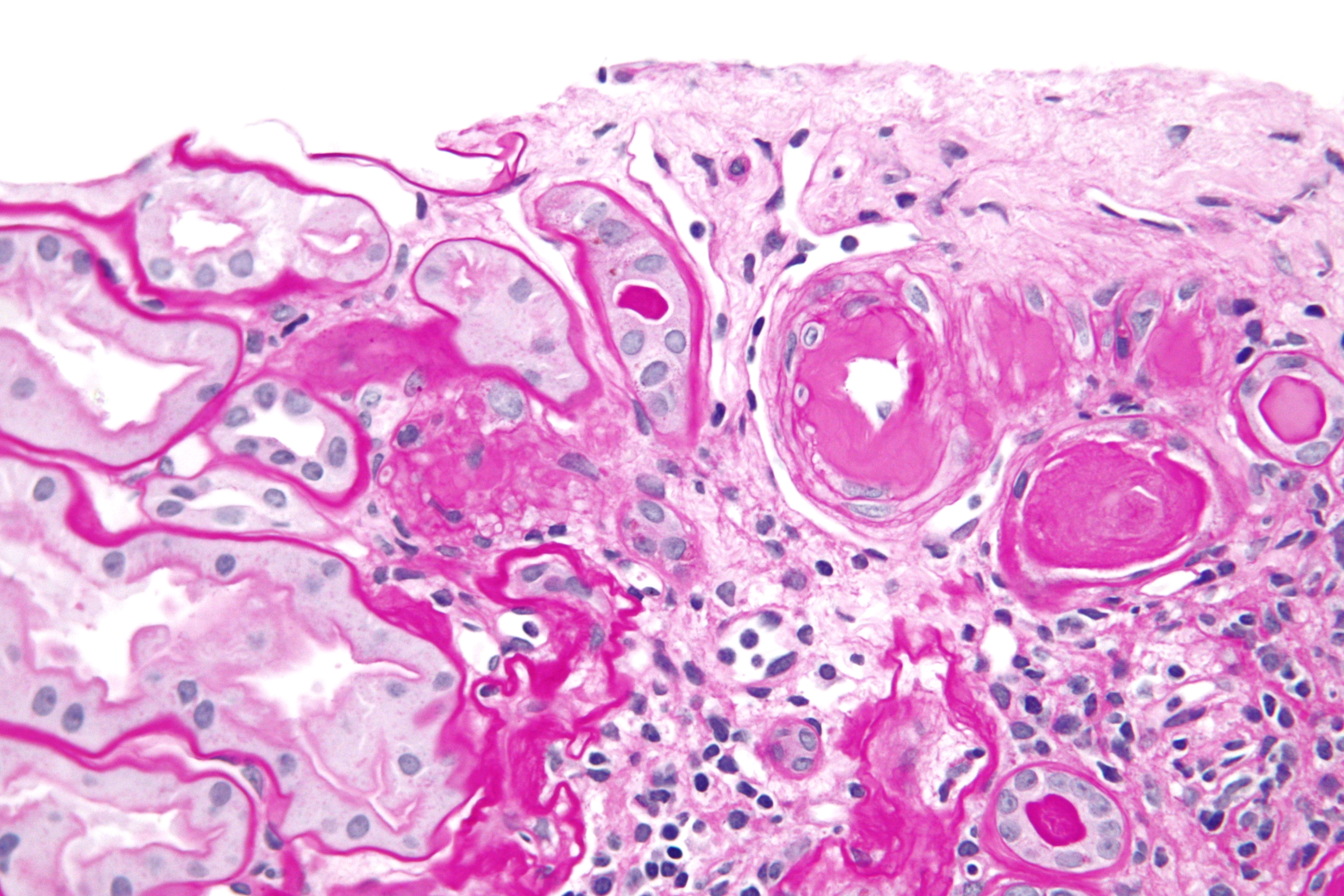
Micrograph showing hyaline arteriolosclerosis in the kidney. PAS stain.

== Hyaline arteriolosclerosis ==
Also arterial hyalinosis and arteriolar hyalinosis refers to thickening of the walls of arterioles by the deposits that appear as homogeneous pink hyaline material in routine staining. It is a type of arteriolosclerosis, which refers to thickening of the arteriolar wall and is part of the aging process.

Associations

It is associated with aging, hypertension, diabetes mellitus, dementia, and may be seen in response to certain drugs (calcineurin inhibitors).

It is often seen in the context of kidney pathology. In hypertension only the afferent arteriole is affected, while in diabetes mellitus, both the afferent and efferent arteriole are affected. It is also seen in retina and brain, where retinal infarcts and small brain infarcts, or lacunes can occur.

Cause

Lesions reflect leakage of plasma components across vascular endothelium and excessive extracellular matrix production by smooth muscle cells, usually secondary to hypertension.

Hyaline arteriolosclerosis is a major morphologic characteristic of benign nephrosclerosis, in which the arteriolar narrowing causes diffuse impairment of renal blood supply, with loss of nephrons. The narrowing of the lumen can decrease renal blood flow and hence glomerular filtration rate leading to increased renin secretion and a perpetuating cycle with increasing blood pressure and decreasing kidney function.

The brain is another organ where hyaline arteriolosclerosis occurs prematurely in patients with high blood pressure. This can cause either kind of stroke: an ischemic infarct or a brain hemorrhage, as the vessels can be blocked or broken.

== Hyperplastic arteriolosclerosis ==
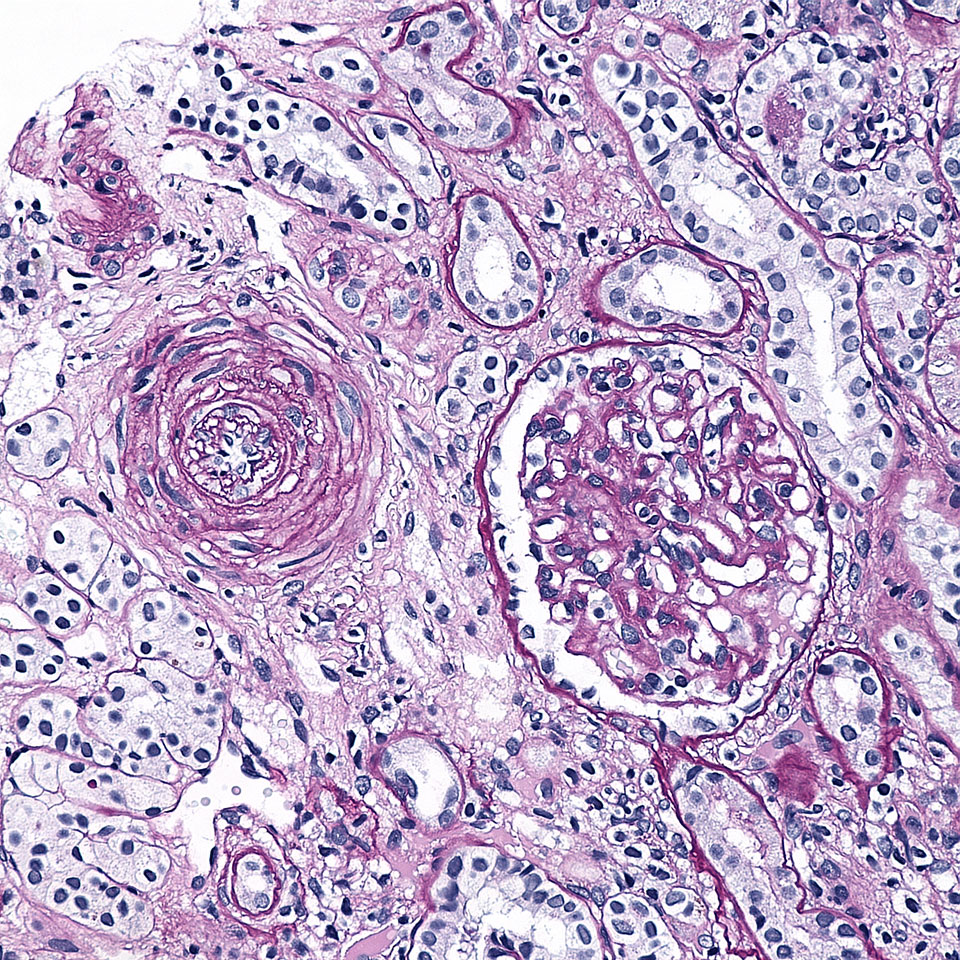
"Onion-skin" renal arteriole

This is a type of arteriolosclerosis involving a narrowed lumen. The term "onion-skin" is sometimes used to describe this form of blood vessel with thickened concentric smooth muscle cell layer and thickened, duplicated basement membrane. In malignant hypertension these hyperplastic changes are often accompanied by fibrinoid necrosis of the arterial intima and media. These changes are most prominent in the kidney and can lead to ischemia and acute kidney failure. In the brain, a small cavity called a lacune is an ischemic cavity that can arise due to brain necrosis, due to arteriolosclerosis.

Cause

It can be caused by malignant hypertension.
