= Urine protein/creatinine ratio =

Ratio of protein excreted in urine

Urine protein/creatinine ratio is a widely used initial method to estimate daily protein excretion in urine. Since the diagnosis and management of proteinuric diseases, many of which affect the renal system, and the staging of chronic kidney disease depend on accurate identification and quantitation of proteinuria, the implementation of the 24-hour urine collection is the most accurate procedure in practice to figure out the urinary protein excretion. However, in current clinical practice, the urine protein/creatinine ratio is widely used to estimate daily protein excretion by virtue of its convenience and simplicity.

The difference between urine protein/creatinine ratio and 24-hour urine collection is that the former requires a urine sample to be collected only once at any time. [Creatinine(U)] is taken into account due to the notion that creatinine is normally released into the urine at a constant rate. Scientists found that the ratio of protein to creatinine roughly estimates the actual value gained from the 24-hour urine protein test. The normal urine protein/creatinine ratio is less than 200 mg/g.
