= Renal segmental hypoplasia =

- Other names: Ask-Upmark kidney
- Specialty: Nephrology

Renal segmental hypoplasia is a kidney with a partially developed or atrophic renal cortex.

== Presentation ==
Ask-Upmark kidneys are a cause of secondary hypertension that can be curable.

== Cause ==
It is thought to be congenital or the consequence of vesicoureteral reflux. in IVU "Slit scar" is seen.

== See also ==
- Hypertension
