= Albuminuria =

Abnormal presence of albumin in the urine

- Other names: Proteinuria
- Specialty: Nephrology
- Causes: Diabetes (Type 1 & Type 2), Hypertension, Urinary tract infections, Kidney Disease, Certain Medications

Albuminuria is a pathological condition of elevated albumin protein in the urine (often measured as urine albumin-to-creatinine ratio of >30 milligrams of albumin per 1 gram of creatinine per day). It is a type of proteinuria, and is the most common protein detected on urinalysis that, when elevated, is associated with kidney and cardiovascular disease (CVD). Albumin is an abundant plasma protein (present in blood) which is normally prevented from being lost into the urine by the sieve-like glomeruli of the nephrons. In healthy people, only trace amounts of it are present in urine, but when the filtration system of the kidney is damaged, larger amounts of albumin escape into the urine, which can be quantified and used to determine the extent of kidney injury/kidney disease.

== Signs and symptoms ==
Albuminuria is often asymptomatic in low quantities but foamy urine may be present. As significant albumin is lost to the urine, swelling of the ankles, hands, belly or face may occur (see edema and nephrotic syndrome). This is because a major role of albumin in the blood is to act as an osmotic agent, keeping water from leaving blood vessels and leaking into the surrounding body tissues.

== Causes ==
Albuminuria is not a disease itself but a marker of kidney injury, particularly to the filtration mechanism (glomerulus), and can be caused by a number of pathological states, including:

- Diabetic nephropathy
- Hypertension
- Various autoimmune disorders
  - Lupus nephritis
  - IgA nephropathy
  - ANCA-associated vasculitis
  - Anti-GBM disease (Goodpasture's syndrome)
  - Membranous nephropathy
  - Antiphospholipid syndrome
  - Alport syndrome
  - Sjogren syndrome
- Dehydration / low blood volume
- Cardiovascular disease
- Nephrotoxic medications
- Infections
- Urinary tract obstruction

In all cases, the result is a loss of the kidney's ability to retain albumin from the urine.

== Diagnosis/Testing ==
According to Kidney Disease Improving Global Outcomes (KDIGO) guidelines, albuminuria is categorized into 3 grades with increasing severity of associated kidney injury: A1, A2, and A3. This grading scale, along with estimated glomerular filtration rate, is used to assess risk of progression and severity of kidney disease, particularly in chronic kidney disease.

KDIGO Albuminuria Categories Based on Urine ACR
Albuminuria Category	ACR (mg/mmol)	ACR (mg/g)
A1 (normal to mildly increased)	<3	<30
A2 (moderately increased)	3–30	30–300
A3 (severely increased)	>30	>300

Various tests are available to measure albuminuria. Urine dipstick analysis can provide a qualitative estimate of the amount of albumin in the urine sample. More quantitative and accurate testing include a spot sample urinalysis and a 24-hour urine collection analysis.

== Treatment ==
Because albuminuria is a sign of underlying kidney injury/disease, treatment should be aimed at the causative factor/s. Common methods of improving and preserving kidney function include medication and lifestyle modifications such as diet and exercise. Blood pressure control, especially with the use of inhibitors of the renin-angiotensin-system, is the most commonly used therapy to control albuminuria.
