= Urinary tract obstruction =

- Specialty: Urology

Urinary tract obstruction is a urologic disease consisting of a decrease in the free passage of urine through one or both ureters and/or the urethra. It is a cause of urinary retention. Complete obstruction of the urinary tract requires prompt treatment for renal preservation. Any sign of infection, such as fever and chills, in the context of obstruction to urine flow constitutes a urologic emergency.

== Causes ==
Causes of urinary tract obstruction include:

- Bladder stone and renal stone
- Benign prostatic hyperplasia
- Obstruction as a congenital disorder.
- Foreign object such as a bullet or pellet.

=== Congenital urinary tract obstruction ===
Urinary tract obstruction as a congenital disorder results in oligohydramnios which in turn can lead to the Potter sequence of atypical physical appearance. Pulmonary hypoplasia is by far the main cause of death in the early neonatal period for children with congenital lower urinary tract obstruction.

Fetal surgery of congenital lower urinary tract obstruction seems to improve survival, according to a randomized yet small study.

Urinary tract obstruction due to foreign object

While uncommon, there are case reports in the human and veterinary literature of a bullet or other ballistic projectile migrating to the urethra and causing a urinary tract obstruction. This has been reported in people, small animals, and a goat.

=== Sitting voiding position ===
A meta-analysis on the influence of voiding position on urodynamics in healthy males and males with LUTS showed that in the sitting position, the residual urine in the bladder was significantly reduced. The other parameters, namely the maximum urinary flow and the voiding time were increased and decreased respectively. For healthy males, no influence was found on these parameters, meaning that they can urinate in either position.

== Diagnosis ==
Diagnosing urinary tract obstruction involves several steps and tests to determine the location and severity of the blockage. Here are some common methods used:

Medical History and Physical Examination: The doctor will ask about symptoms, medical history, and perform a physical examination to check for signs of urinary tract obstruction.

Imaging Tests:

- Ultrasound: This is often the first imaging test used to detect obstructions in the urinary tract.
- CT Scan: Provides detailed images of the urinary tract and can help identify the location and cause of the obstruction.
- MRI: Used in some cases to get detailed images of the urinary tract.

Urine Tests: These tests can detect signs of infection, blood, or other abnormalities in the urine.

Blood Tests: These tests can check for signs of kidney damage or infection.

Cystoscopy: A procedure where a thin tube with a camera is inserted into the urethra to examine the bladder and urethra for obstructions.

Urodynamic Tests: These tests measure the pressure and flow of urine to help identify blockages.

Nuclear Scans: These scans use a small amount of radioactive material to evaluate kidney function and detect obstructions.

== Treatment ==
Treatment depends on the underlying cause of the obstruction and the severity of the symptoms. Urinary catheterization is an emergency treatment for obstruction, and intermittent catheterization may also be a suitable long-term solution. It is rarely necessary to create a ureterocutaneostomy.
