= Proteinuria =

Presence of an excess of serum proteins in the urine

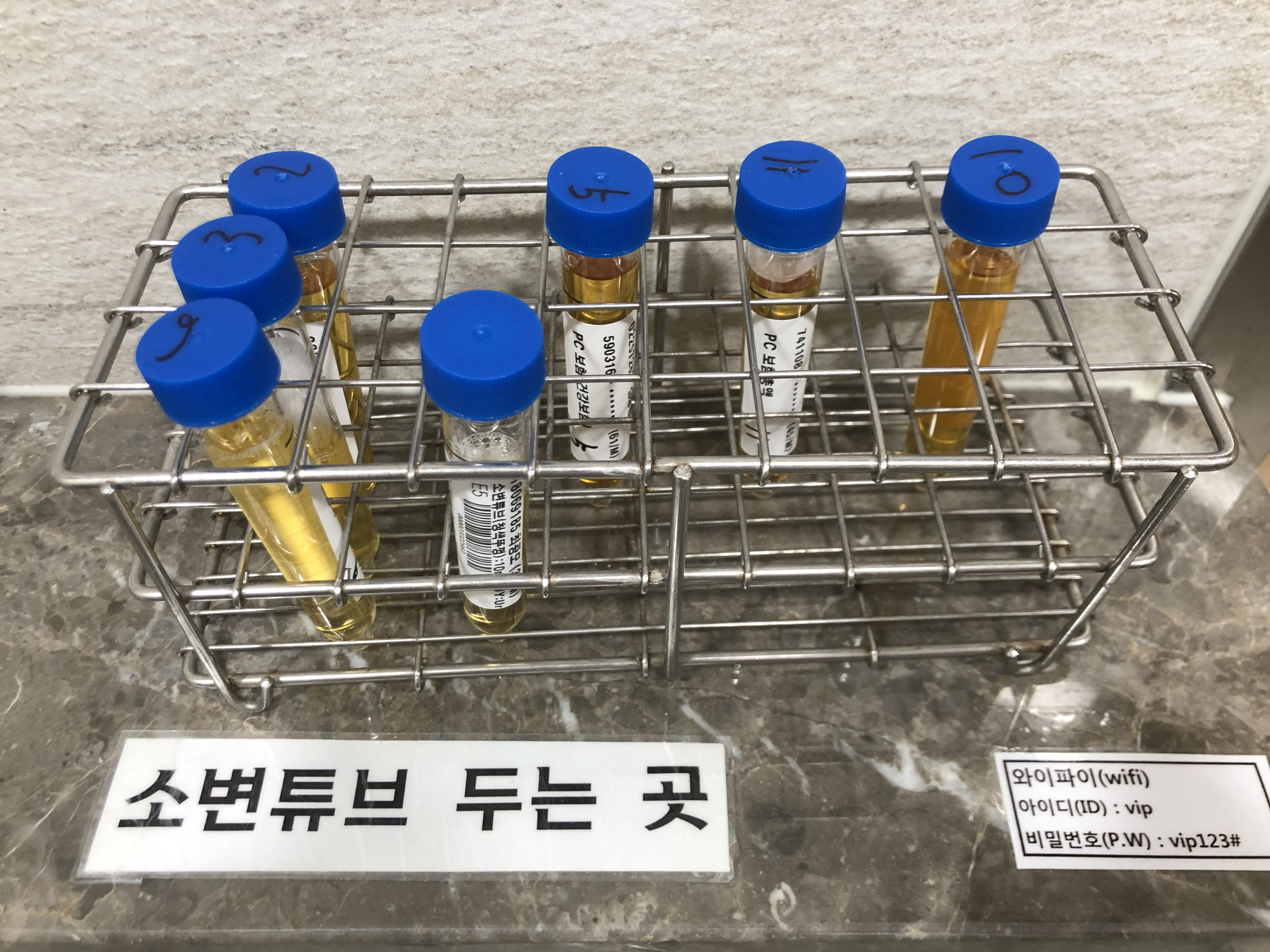
- Various test tubes of urine
- Pronunciation: /ˌproʊtiːˈnjʊəriə/
- Specialty: Nephrology
- Complications: Protein toxicity

Proteinuria is the presence of excess proteins in the urine. In healthy persons, urine contains very little protein, less than 150 mg/day; an excess is suggestive of illness. Excess protein in the urine often causes the urine to become foamy (although this symptom may also be caused by other conditions). Severe proteinuria can cause nephrotic syndrome in which there is worsening swelling of the body.

== Signs and symptoms ==
Proteinuria often causes no symptoms and it may only be discovered incidentally.

Foamy urine is considered a cardinal sign of proteinuria, but only a third of people with foamy urine have proteinuria as the underlying cause. It may also be caused by bilirubin in the urine (bilirubinuria), retrograde ejaculation, glycosuria, dehydration, a fast urine stream, pneumaturia (air bubbles in the urine) due to a fistula, or drugs such as phenazopyridine (trademarked as 'Pyridium').

== Causes ==
There are three main mechanisms to cause proteinuria:

- Due to disease in the glomerulus
- Because of increased quantity of proteins in serum (overflow proteinuria)
- Due to low reabsorption at proximal tubule (Fanconi syndrome)

Proteinuria can also be caused by certain biological agents, such as bevacizumab (Avastin) used in cancer treatment. Excessive fluid intake (drinking in excess of 3.79 liters (one gallon) of water per day) is another cause.

=== Conditions with proteinuria ===
Proteinuria may be a feature of the following conditions:

- Nephrotic syndromes (i.e. intrinsic kidney failure)
- Pre-eclampsia
- Eclampsia
- Toxic lesions of kidneys
- Amyloidosis
- Collagen vascular diseases (e.g. systemic lupus erythematosus)
- Dehydration
- Glomerular diseases, such as membranous glomerulonephritis, focal segmental glomerulonephritis, minimal change disease (lipoid nephrosis)
- Strenuous exercise
- Stress
- Benign orthostatic (postural) proteinuria
- Focal segmental glomerulosclerosis (FSGS)
- IgA nephropathy (i.e. Berger's disease)
- IgM nephropathy
- Membranoproliferative glomerulonephritis
- Membranous nephropathy
- Minimal change disease
- Sarcoidosis
- Alport syndrome
- Diabetes mellitus (diabetic nephropathy)
- Drugs (e.g. NSAIDs, nicotine, penicillamine, lithium carbonate, gold and other heavy metals, ACE inhibitors, antibiotics, or opiates (especially heroin)
- Fabry disease
- Infections (e.g. HIV, syphilis, hepatitis, poststreptococcal infection, urinary schistosomiasis)
- Aminoaciduria
- Fanconi syndrome in association with Wilson disease
- Hypertensive nephrosclerosis
- Interstitial nephritis
- Sickle cell disease
- Hemoglobinuria
- Multiple myeloma
- Myoglobinuria
- Organ rejection:
- Ebola virus disease
- Nail–patella syndrome
- Familial Mediterranean fever
- HELLP syndrome
- Systemic lupus erythematosus
- Granulomatosis with polyangiitis
- Rheumatoid arthritis
- Glycogen storage disease type 1
- Goodpasture syndrome
- Henoch–Schönlein purpura
- A urinary tract infection which has spread to the kidney(s)
- Sjögren syndrome
- Post-infectious glomerulonephritis
- Living kidney donor
- Polycystic kidney disease

=== Bence–Jones proteinuria ===
- Amyloidosis
- Pre-malignant plasma cell dyscrasias:
  - Monoclonal gammopathy of undetermined significance
  - Smoldering multiple myeloma
- Malignant plasma cell dyscrasias
  - Multiple myeloma
  - Waldenström's macroglobulinemia
- Other malignancies
  - Chronic lymphocytic leukemia
  - Rare cases of other Lymphoid leukemias
  - Rare cases of Lymphomas

== Pathophysiology ==
Protein is the building block of all living organisms. When kidneys are functioning properly by filtering the blood, they distinguish the proteins from the wastes which were previously present together in the blood. Thereafter, kidneys retain or reabsorb the filtered proteins and return them to the circulating blood while removing wastes by excreting them in the urine. Whenever the kidney is compromised, their ability to filter the blood by differentiating protein from the waste, or retaining the filtered protein then returning which back to the body, is damaged. As a result, there is a significant amount of protein is discharged along with waste in the urine, which makes the concentration of proteins in urine high enough to be detected by well-known chemical tests. Elevated concentration of proteins in urine is not always caused by a kidney disease. Consumption of high amounts of protein with food can also result in such symptom.

=== Albumin and immunoglobins ===
Albumin is a protein produced by the liver which makes up roughly 50%-60% of the total proteins in the blood while the other 40%-50% are proteins other than albumin, such as immunoglobins. This is why the concentration of albumin in the urine is one of the single sensitive indicators of kidney disease, particularly for those with diabetes or hypertension, compared to routine proteinuria examination.

As the loss of proteins from the body progresses, the illness becomes symptomatic.

The exception applies to the scenario when there's an overproduction of proteins in the body, in which the kidney is not to blame.

== Classification ==
Proteinuria may be classified as selective or non-selective. In selective proteinuria, the level of high molecular proteins such as immunoglobulin G in the excreted urine is low, whereas in non-selective proteinuria, it is high. Selective proteinuria, where proteins of smaller molecular weight pass through the filtration membrane whereas the content of large molecule proteins is low, suggests mild glomerular damage. The proteinuria selectivity index (PSI) may be calculated according to the formula: urine IgG/serum IgG and serum albumin/urine albumin. A PSI < 0.1 indicates highly selective proteinuria. This classification has significant implications for the treatment and prognosis of renal disease.

== Diagnosis ==
Protein dipstick grading
Designation	Approx. amount	
Designation	Concentration	Daily
Trace	5–20 mg/dL	
1+	30 mg/dL	Less than 0.5 g/day
2+	100 mg/dL	0.5–1 g/day
3+	300 mg/dL	1–2 g/day
4+	More than 1000 mg/dL	More than 2 g/day

Conventionally, proteinuria is diagnosed by a simple dipstick test, although it is possible for the test to give a false negative reading, even with nephrotic range proteinuria if the urine is dilute. False negatives may also occur if the protein in the urine is composed mainly of globulins or Bence Jones proteins because the reagent on the test strips, bromophenol blue, is highly specific for albumin. Traditionally, dipstick protein tests would be quantified by measuring the total quantity of protein in a 24-hour urine collection test, and abnormal globulins by specific requests for protein electrophoresis.

More recently developed technology detects human serum albumin (HSA) through the use of liquid crystals (LCs). The presence of HSA molecules disrupts the LCs supported on the AHSA-decorated slides thereby producing bright optical signals which are easily distinguishable. Using this assay, concentrations of HSA as low as 15 μg/mL can be detected.

Alternatively, the concentration of protein in the urine may be compared to the creatinine level in a spot urine sample. This is termed the protein/creatinine ratio. The 2005 UK Chronic Kidney Disease guidelines state that protein/creatinine ratio is a better test than 24-hour urinary protein measurement. Proteinuria is defined as a protein/creatinine ratio greater than 45 mg/mmol (which is equivalent to albumin/creatinine ratio of greater than 30 mg/mmol or approximately 300 mg/g) with very high levels of proteinuria having a ratio greater than 100 mg/mmol.

Protein dipstick measurements should not be confused with the amount of protein detected on a test for microalbuminuria which denotes values for protein for urine in mg/day versus urine protein dipstick values which denote values for protein in mg/dL. That is, there is a basal level of proteinuria that can occur below 30 mg/day which is considered non-pathology. Values between 30 and 300 mg/day are termed microalbuminuria which is considered pathologic. Urine protein lab values for microalbumin of >30 mg/day correspond to a detection level within the "trace" to "1+" range of a urine dipstick protein assay. Therefore, positive indication of any protein detected on a urine dipstick assay obviates any need to perform a urine microalbumin test as the upper limit for microalbuminuria has already been exceeded.

=== Analysis ===
It is possible to analyze urine samples in determining albumin, hemoglobin and myoglobin with an optimized MEKC method.

== Treatment ==
The most common cause is diabetic nephropathy; in this case, proper glycemic control may slow the progression. Medical management consists of angiotensin converting enzyme (ACE) inhibitors, which are typically first-line therapy for proteinuria. In patients whose proteinuria is not controlled with ACE inhibitors, the addition of an aldosterone antagonist (i.e., spironolactone) or angiotensin receptor blocker (ARB) may further reduce protein loss.

Atrasentan (Vanrafia) was approved for medical use in the United States in April 2025.

== See also ==
- List of terms associated with diabetes
- Edmund Randerath
