= Microalbuminuria =

- Other names: Moderately Increased Albuminuria
- Specialty: Nephrology

Microalbuminuria is a term to describe a moderate increase in the level of urine albumin. It occurs when the kidney leaks small amounts of albumin into the urine, in other words, when an abnormally high permeability for albumin in the glomerulus of the kidney occurs. Normally, the kidneys filter albumin, so if albumin is found in the urine, then it is a marker of kidney disease. The term microalbuminuria is now discouraged by Kidney Disease: Improving Global Outcomes and has been replaced by moderately increased albuminuria.

== Causes ==
Higher dietary intake of sodium may increase risk for microalbuminuria, while diets higher in beta-carotene, fruits, vegetables, and whole grains but lower in meat and sweets may be protective against kidney function decline.

=== Associations ===
- Marker of vascular endothelial dysfunction
- An important prognostic marker for kidney disease
  - in diabetes mellitus
  - in hypertension
  - in post-streptococcal glomerulonephritis
- Increasing microalbuminuria during the first 48 hours after admission to an intensive care unit predicts elevated risk for acute respiratory failure, multiple organ failure, and overall mortality
- A risk factor for venous thromboembolism

Microalbuminuria is an important adverse predictor of glycemic outcomes in prediabetes. Prediabetes individuals with increased microalbuminuria even in the so-called normal range is associated with increased progression to diabetes and decreased reversal to normoglycemia. Hence, prediabetes individuals with microalbuminuria warrant more aggressive intervention to prevent diabetes in them.

== Diagnosis and treatment ==
The level of albumin protein produced by microalbuminuria can be detected by special albumin-specific urine dipsticks, which have a lower detection threshold than standard urine dipsticks. A microalbumin urine test determines the presence of the albumin in urine. In a properly functioning body, albumin is not normally present in urine because it is retained in the bloodstream by the kidneys.

Microalbuminuria can be diagnosed from a 24-hour urine collection (between 30 and 300 mg/24 hours) or, more commonly, from elevated concentration in a spot sample (30 to 300 mg/L). Both must be measured on at least two of three measurements over a two- to three-month period.

An albumin level above the upper limit values is called "macroalbuminuria", or sometimes just albuminuria. Sometimes, the upper limit value is given as one less (such as 300 being given as 299) to mark that the higher value (here 300) is defined as macroalbuminuria.

=== Albumin/creatinine ratio ===
To compensate for variations in urine concentration in spot-check samples, comparing the amount of albumin in the sample against its concentration of creatinine is helpful. This is termed the albumin/creatinine ratio (ACR) and microalbuminuria is defined as ACR ≥3.5 mg/mmol (female) or ≥2.5 mg/mmol (male), or with both substances measured by mass, as an ACR between 30 and 300 μg albumin/mg creatinine. For the diagnosis of microalbuminuria, care must be taken when collecting sample for the urine ACR. An early-morning sample is preferred. The patient should refrain from heavy exercises 24 hours before the test. A repeat test should be done 3 to 6 months after the first positive test for microalbuminuria. Lastly, the test is inaccurate in a person with very high or very low muscle mass. This is due to the variation in creatinine level which is produced by the muscle.

Definitions of microalbuminuria
	Individual	Lower limit	Upper limit	Unit
24h urine collection		30	300	mg/24h (milligram albumin per 24 hours)
Short-time urine collection		20	200	μg/min (microgram albumin per minute)
Spot urine albumin sample		30	300	mg/L (milligram albumin per liter of urine)
Spot urine albumin/creatinine ratio	Women	3.5	25 or 35	mg/mmol (milligram albumin per millimole creatinine)
Spot urine albumin/creatinine ratio	Women	30	400	μg/mg (microgram albumin per milligram creatinine)
Spot urine albumin/creatinine ratio	Men	2.5 or 3.5	25 or 35	mg/mmol
Spot urine albumin/creatinine ratio	Men	30	300	μg/mg
