= Arcuate =

Arcuate (Latin for "curved") can refer to:

== Anatomy ==
- Arcuate fasciculus
- Arcuate line (disambiguation)
- Arcuate artery (disambiguation), several arteries
- Arcuate nucleus (hypothalamus)
- Arcuate nucleus (medulla)
- Arcuate ligaments of the diaphragm
- Arcuate vein
- Arcuate vessels of uterus
- Internal arcuate fibers of the brain

== Other ==
- Arcuate architecture, employing its arches and beams
- Arcuate delta, a type of river delta
- Arcuate pocket a type of pocket used in clothing, especially jeans made by Levi Strauss
- Arcuate rack, a curved rack gear
