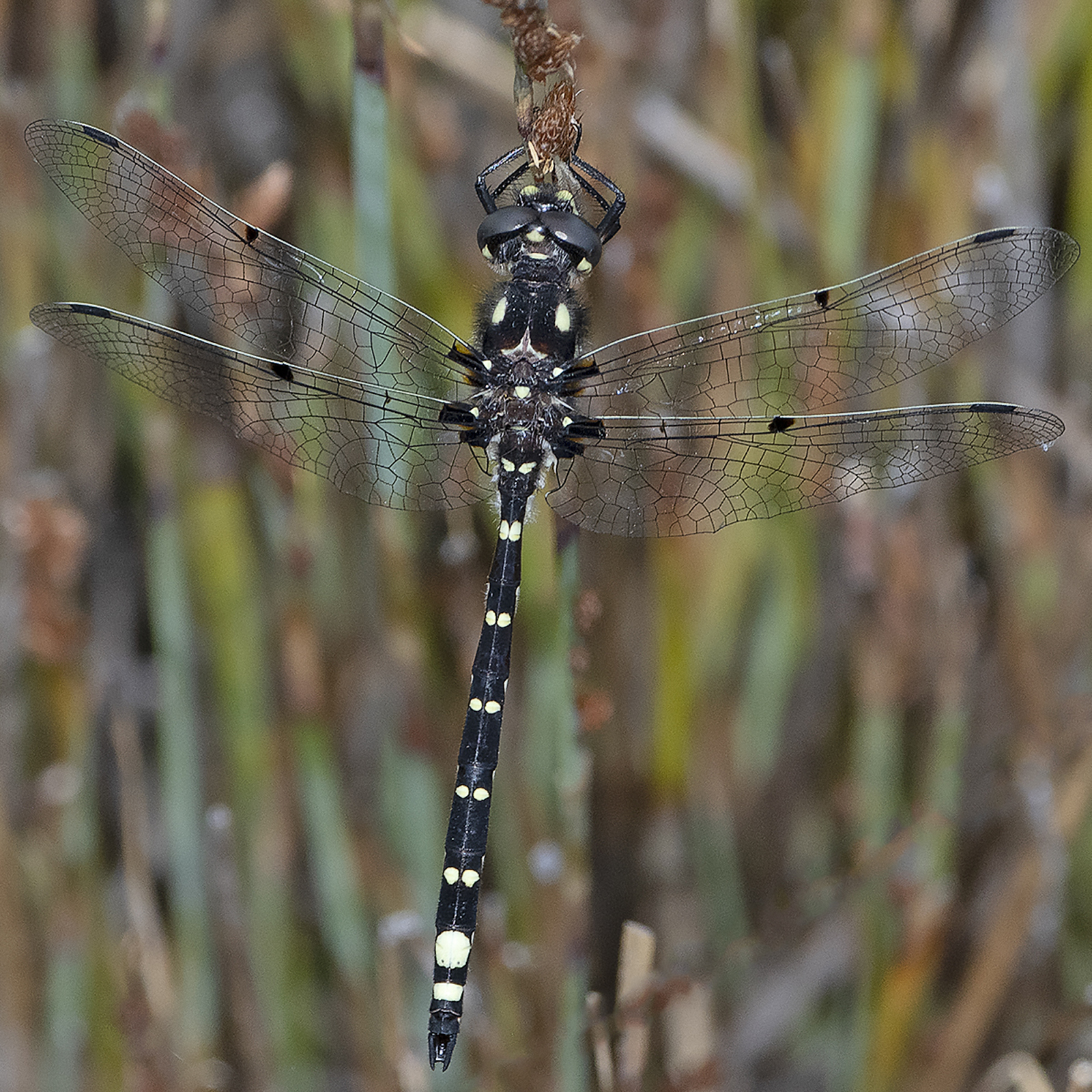
- Male
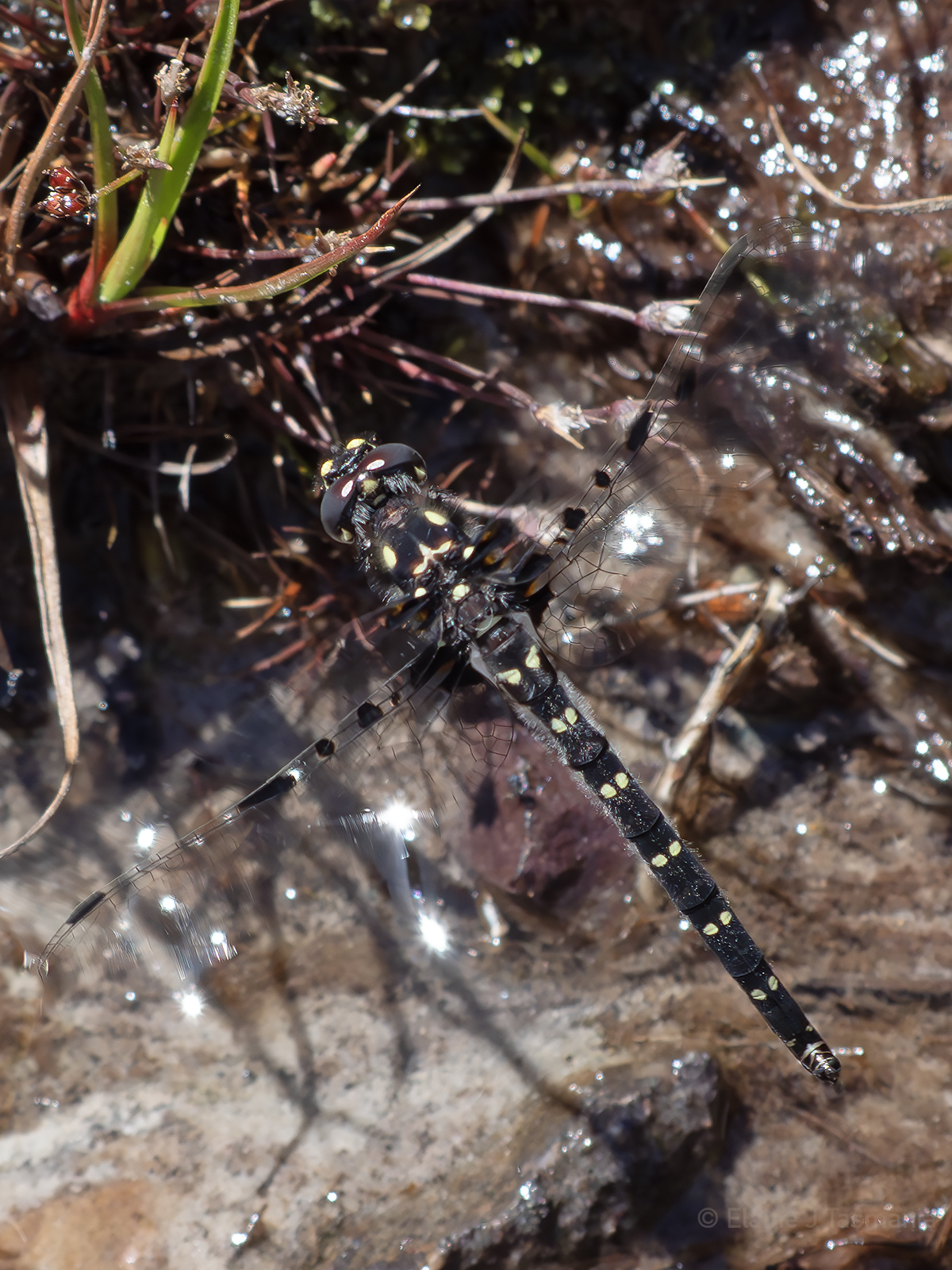
- Female

Conservation status
- Least Concern (IUCN 3.1)

Scientific classification
- Kingdom: Animalia
- Phylum: Arthropoda
- Clade: Pancrustacea
- Class: Insecta
- Order: Odonata
- Suborder: Anisoptera
- Superfamily: Libelluloidea
- Family: Synthemistidae
- Genus: Synthemiopsis; Tillyard, 1917^{:463}
- Species: S. gomphomacromioides

Binomial name
- Synthemiopsis gomphomacromioides Tillyard, 1917 ^{:464}

= Synthemiopsis =

Tasmanian spotwing

Genus of dragonflies

Synthemiopsis gomphomacromioides, also known as the Tasmanian spotwing, is a species of dragonfly from southern and north-western Tasmania, Australia. It is the only species in the genus Synthemiopsis and has also been placed in its own tribe, Synthemiopsini. R. J. Tillyard, who first described it, considered it intermediate between the Australian genus Synthemis and the Chilean Gomphomacromia. He had material from swamps around Cradle Mountain, at about 4,000 feet (1,200 m) altitude, and from Flowerdale Creek near Wynyard. Synthemiopsis gomphomacromioides flies rapidly over the swamps and often sits on reeds. It occurs together with Synthemis tasmanica, a similar but duller-coloured species.

== Documentation ==
Tillyard described Synthemiopsis gomphomacromioides in 1917 on the basis of both adults and larvae, but his larvae are in fact probably Synthemis tasmanica, a different dragonfly species. Arthropod researcher Günther Theischinger documented the larvae of Synthemiopsis gomphomacromioides while on a holiday trip in 1994 to Tasmania, near Mount Darwin. Despite falling and breaking his ribs at the start of the holiday, Theischinger observed a newly emerged Synthemiopsis gomphomacromioides dragonfly, and finally discovered exuviae (remains from moulting) from a single female and several larvae. At home, however, he reidentified the exuviae and larvae as Archaeosynthemis macrostigma orientalis, another dragonfly from the same group. He discovered several confusions among larvae from this dragonfly group. After collecting in Tasmania again in 1999, he concluded that the specimens he had found in 1994 were in fact Synthemiopsis gomphomacromioides.

== Description ==
Synthemiopsis gomphomacromioides is a mostly black dragonfly with yellow markings. The wings are transparent and the veins are black. A black patch occurs at the base of each of the wings and further black spots are on other parts of the wings. Most of the head is black. The eyes are brown. The thorax is also black, but bears long, gray hairs above. The legs are mostly black. The first two segments of the abdomen are wide, but the third and following segments are narrow. The abdomen is mostly black, but the third through ninth segments are marked with yellow spots above and the third through eighth also have spots at the sides. The total length is 43 mm, of which the abdomen takes 31 mm. The fore- and hindwings are 38.5 and 37.5 mm long, respectively.

Theischinger also documented measurements and additional details of the larval specimen. They are brown in colour and about 22 mm, with the eyes set apart about 5 mm. The larvae's abdomen was 14.3 mm in length, and the base of its wings measured roughly 1 mm. The prementum was thin and the ligula large, but not yet fully developed. Its setae were small in comparison to most specimens, and its frontal plate was not fully developed, either. The eyes protrude dorsally and laterally and a lack of hair was seen along the eyes. The postocular lobes were round in shape and not well defined. Adult males have short anal appendages that develop during the final instar phase of development.

== Etymology ==
The genus name Synthemiopsis combines the existing genus name Synthemis with the Greek suffix ὄψις (opsis, "appearance" or "outward form"), indicating the resemblance of one genus to another. The name refers to this genus being intermediate between two existing genera.

The species name gomphomacromioides combines the genus name Gomphomacromia with the Greek suffix –ώδης (-ōdēs, "resembling" or "having the nature of"), referring to its similarity to members of that genus.

== Gallery ==
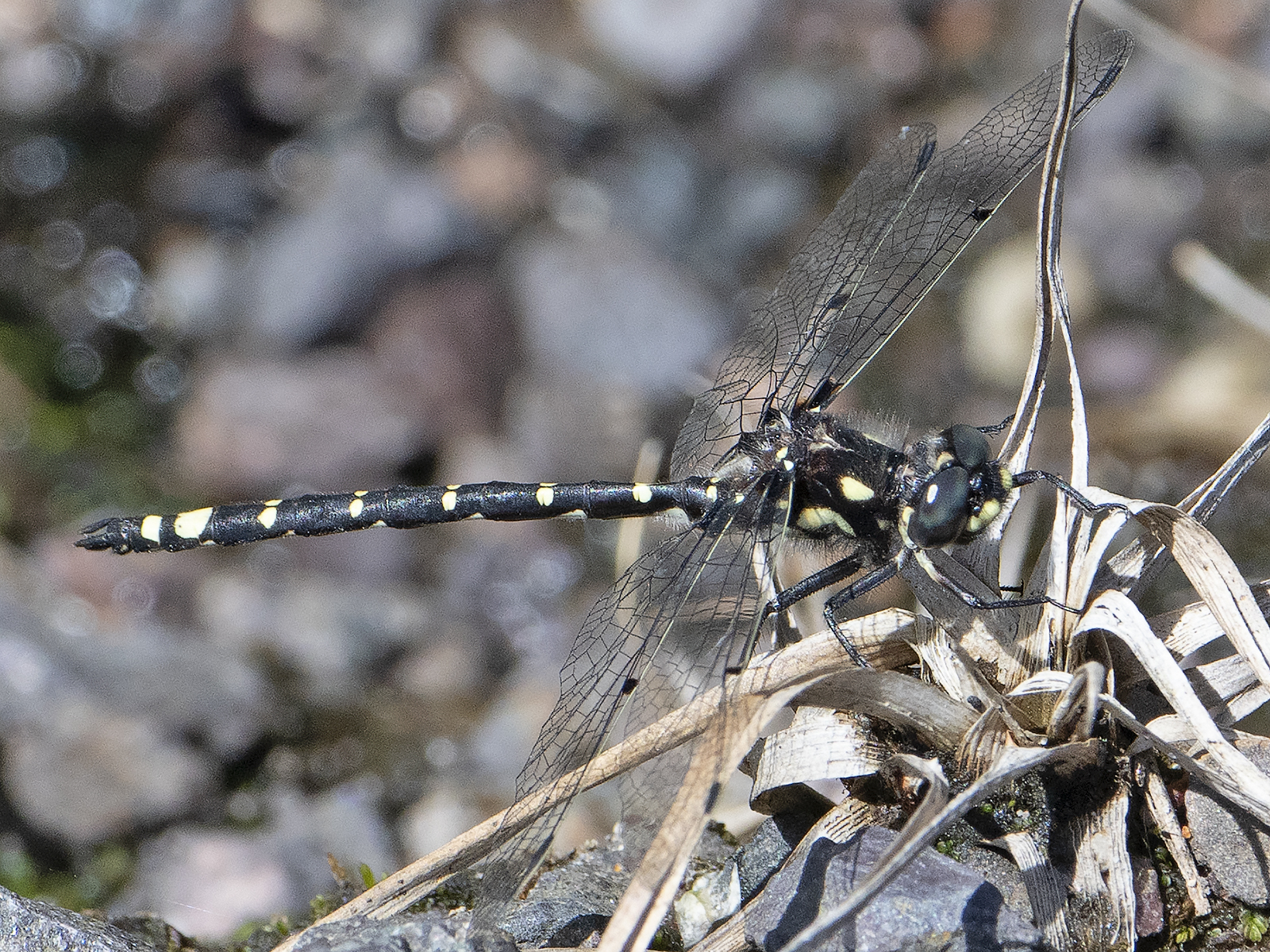
Male

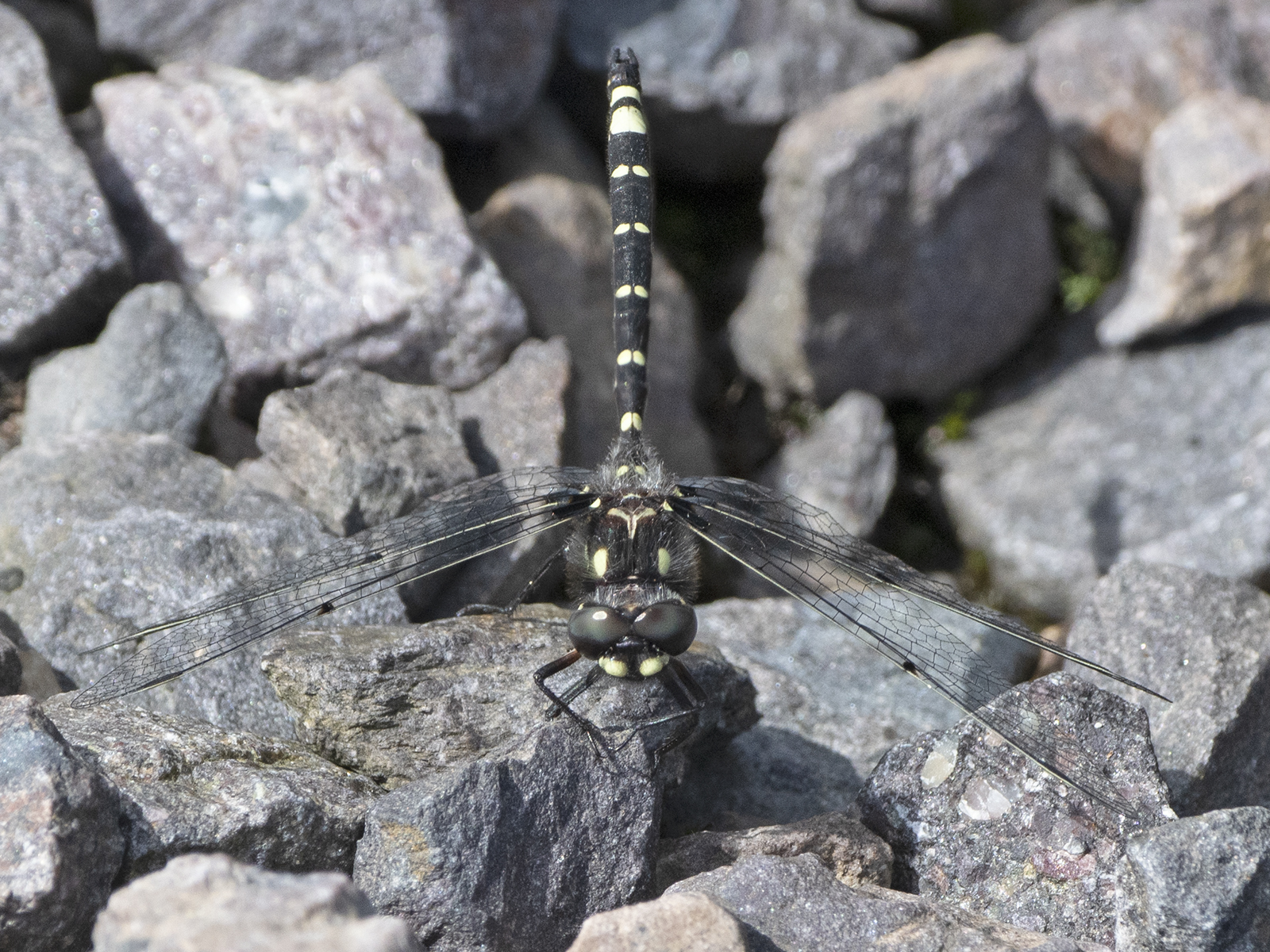
Male

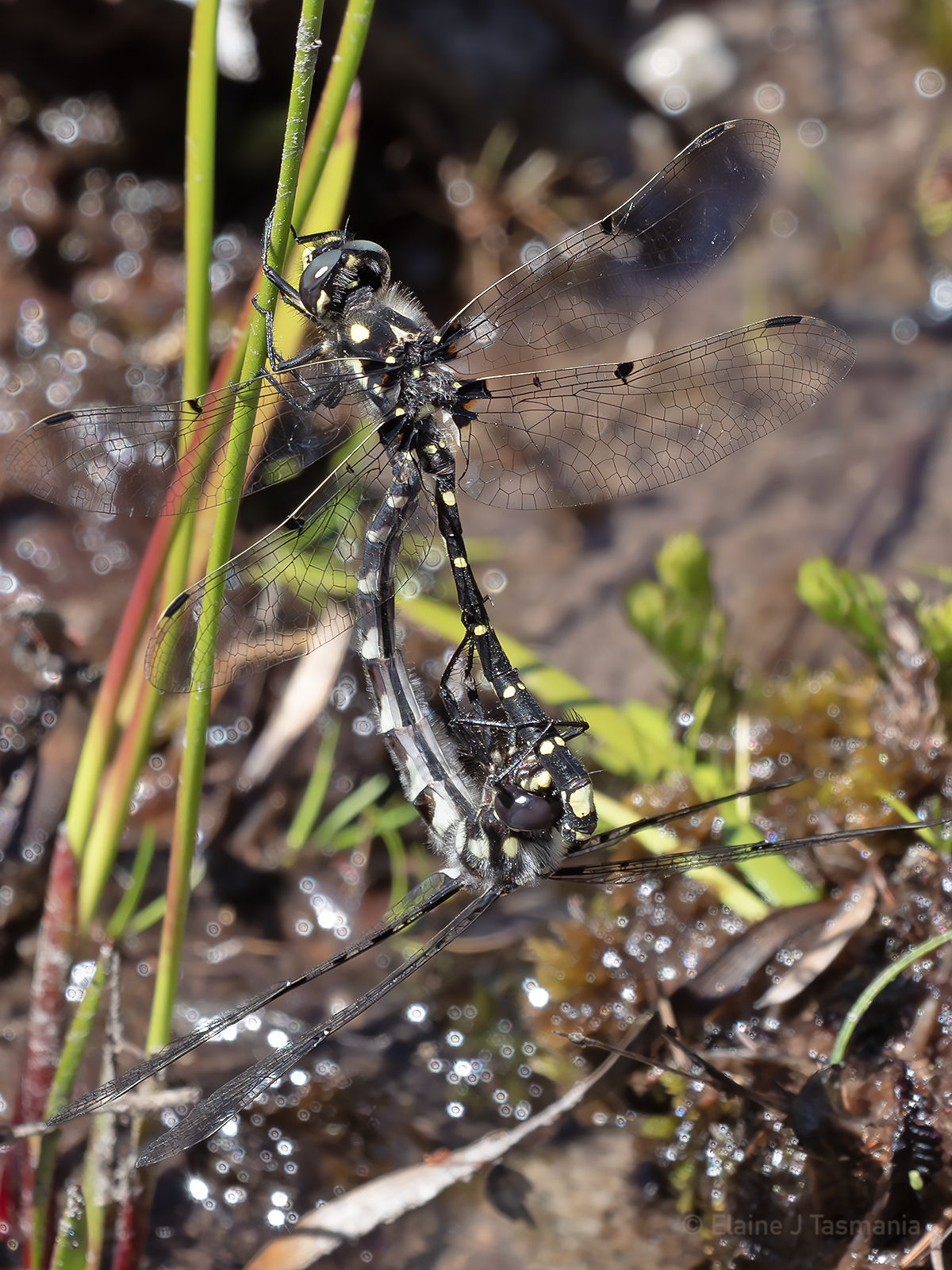
Mating pair

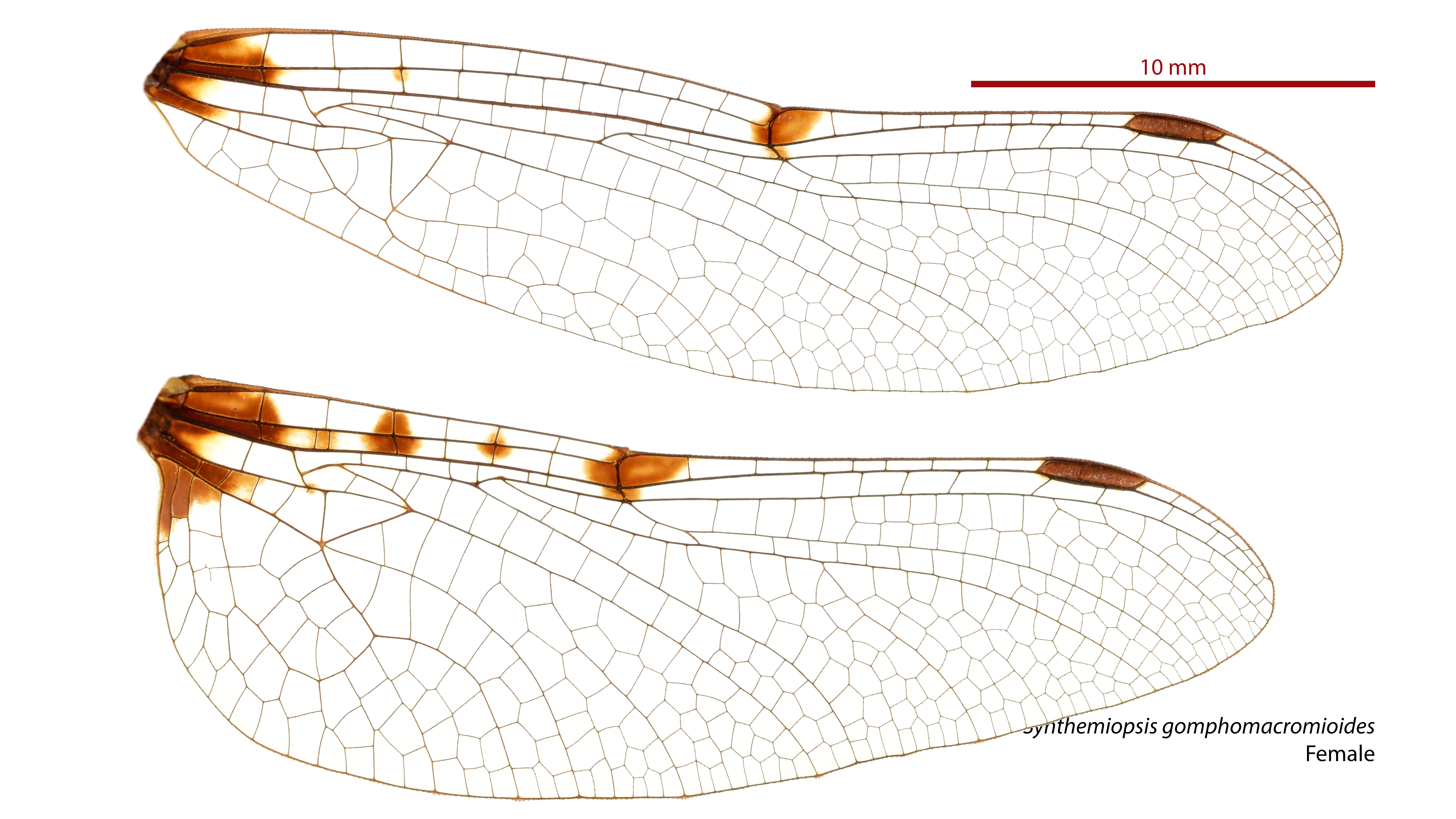
Female Synthemiopsis gomphomacromioides wings

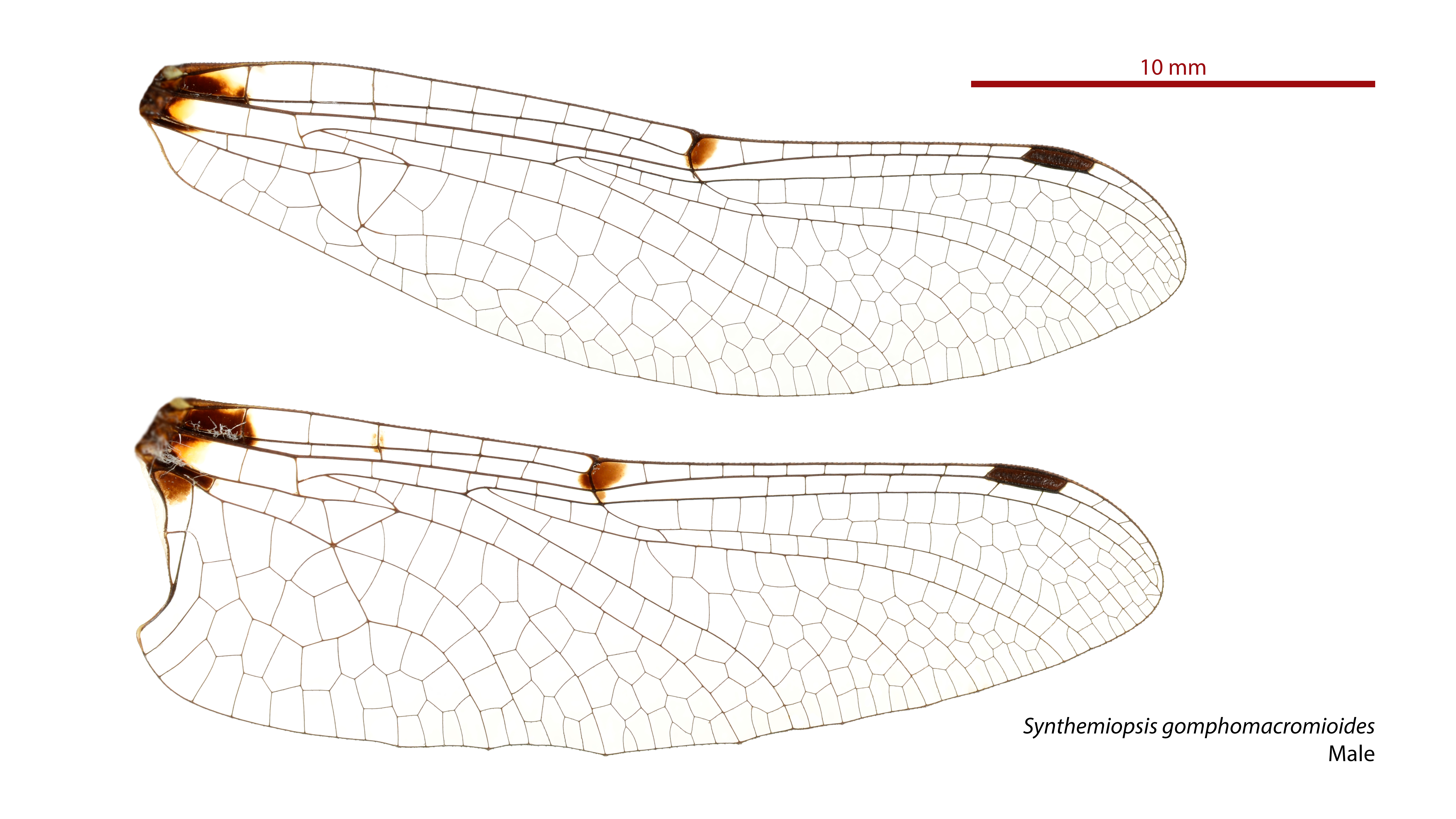
Male Synthemiopsis gomphomacromioides wings
