= Arcuate vessel =

An arcuate (arch-shaped) vessel may refer to:

- Arcuate vessel of the kidney:
  - Arcuate arteries of the kidney
  - Arcuate vein
- Arcuate vessels of the uterus
