= Austrosynthemis =

Turquoise tigertail

Conservation status
- Least Concern (IUCN 3.1)

Scientific classification
- Kingdom: Animalia
- Phylum: Arthropoda
- Clade: Pancrustacea
- Class: Insecta
- Order: Odonata
- Suborder: Anisoptera
- Superfamily: Libelluloidea
- Family: Synthemistidae
- Genus: Austrosynthemis; Carle, 1995
- Species: A. cyanitincta

Binomial name
- Austrosynthemis cyanitincta (Tillyard, 1908)

Synonyms
- Synthemis cyanitincta Tillyard, 1908

Genus of dragonflies

Austrosynthemis is a monotypic genus of dragonfly in the family Synthemistidae. Its single species, Austrosynthemis cyanitincta, more commonly known as the turquoise tigertail, is found in south-western Australia, where it inhabits streams.

Austrosynthemis cyanitincta is a small, black dragonfly with blue markings.

== Etymology ==
The genus name Austrosynthemis combines the prefix austro- (from Latin auster, meaning “south wind”, hence “southern”) with Synthemis, a genus name derived from Greek σύν (syn, “together”) and -themis, from Greek Θέμις (Themis), the goddess of divine law, order and justice. In early odonate taxonomy, names ending in -themis were introduced by Hagen and were widely used for dragonflies.

The species name cyanitincta is likely derived from Greek κυανοῦς (kyanous, "blue" or "azure") and Latin tingere ("to dye"), referring to the distinctive pale blue spots on the abdomen.

== Gallery ==
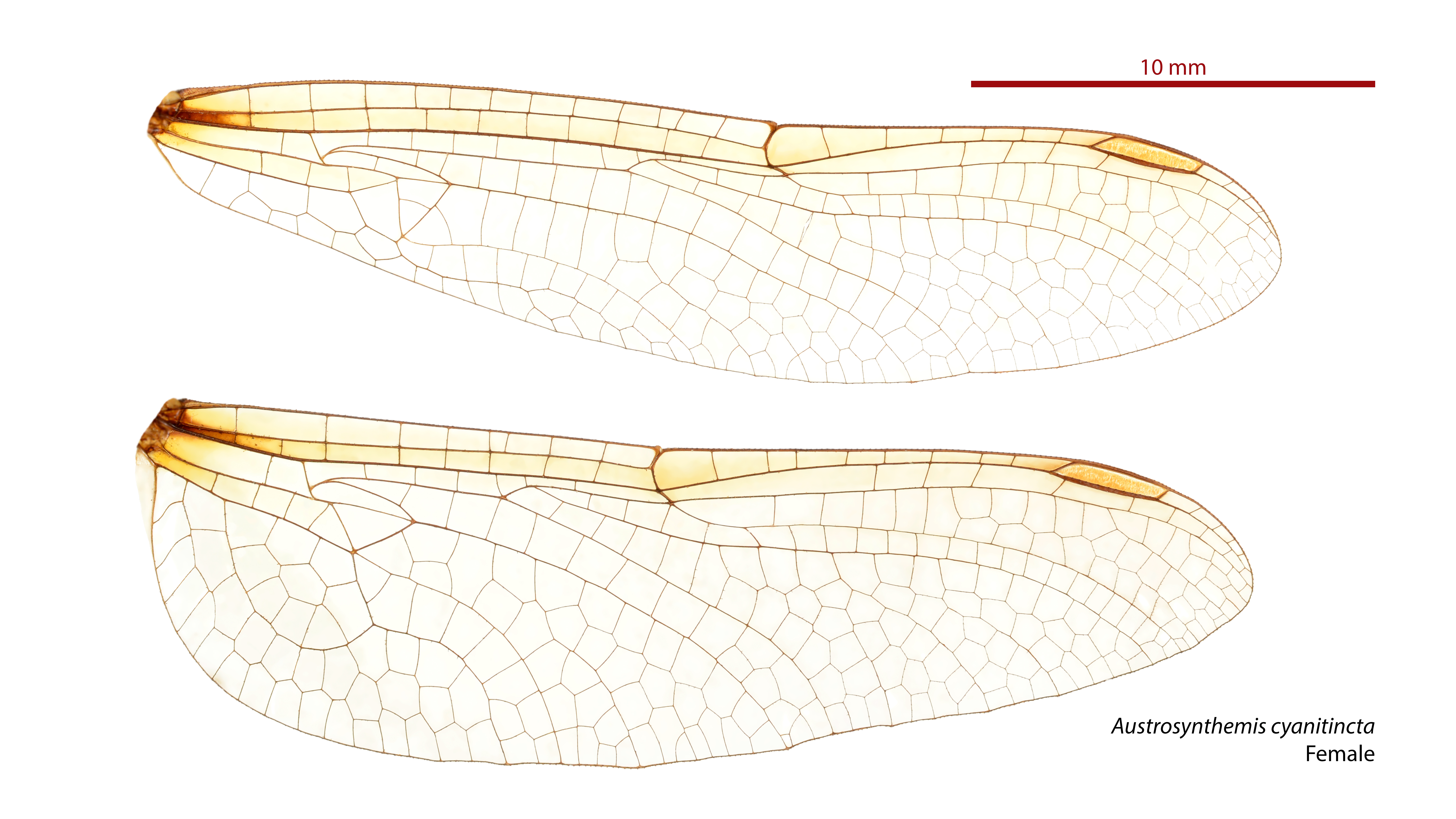
Female Austrosynthemis cyanitincta wings

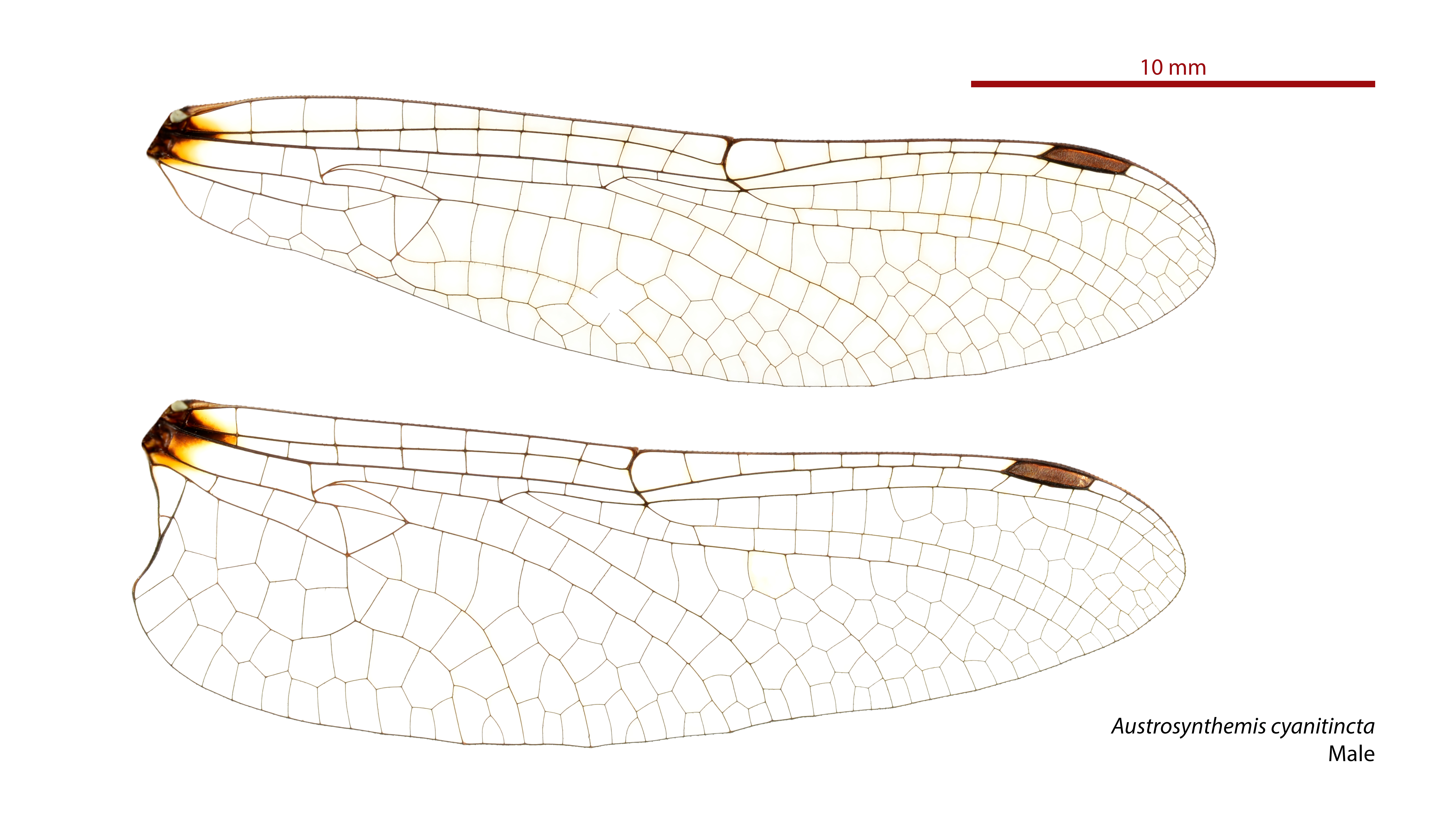
Male Austrosynthemis cyanitincta wings
