= Parenchyma =

Visceral tissue found inside organs of animals

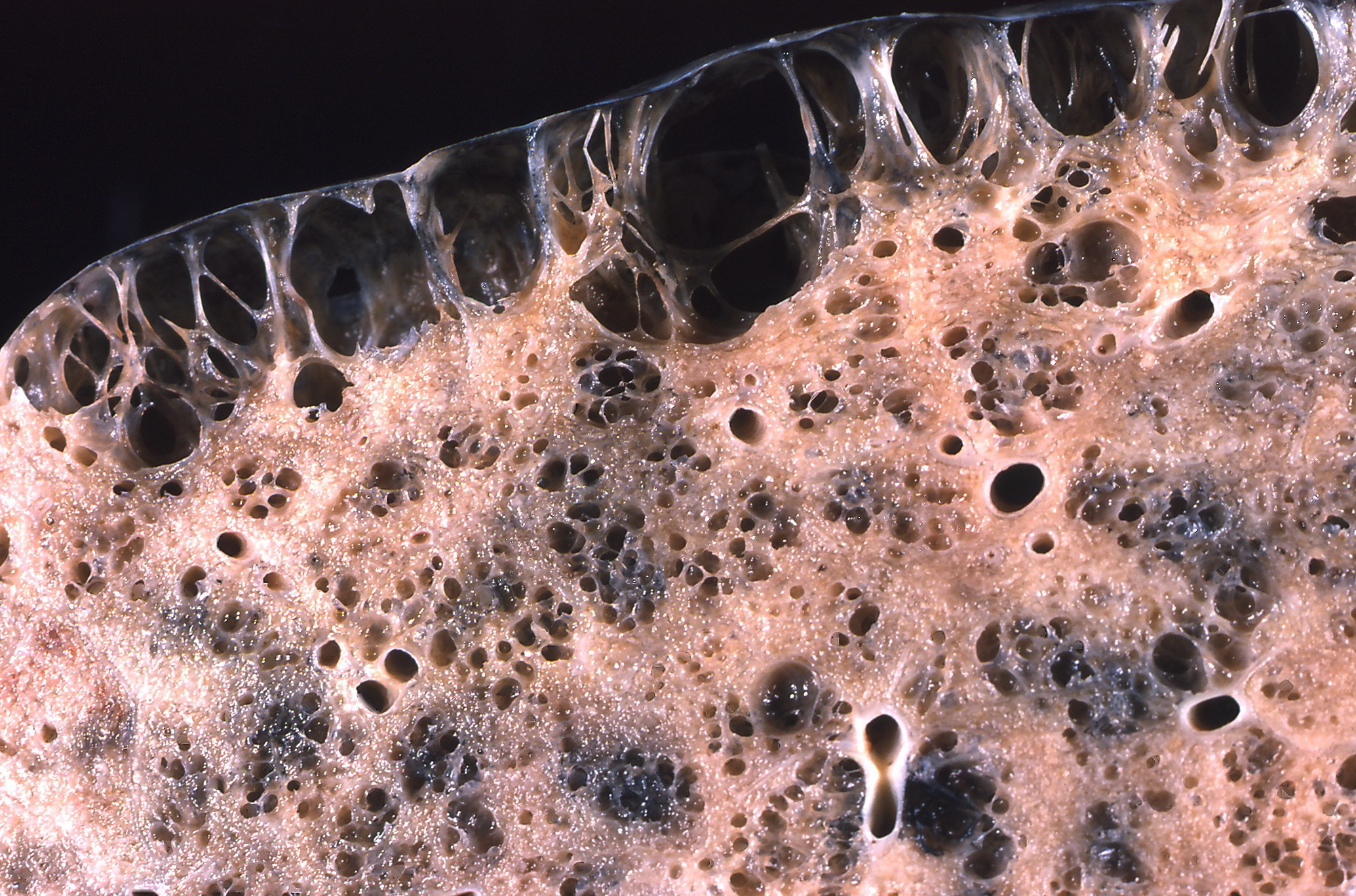
Lung parenchyma showing damage due to large subpleural bullae.

Parenchyma (/pəˈrɛŋkɪmə/) is the bulk of functional substance in an animal organ such as the brain or lungs, or a structure such as a tumour. In zoology, it is the tissue that fills the interior of flatworms. In botany, it is some layers in the cross-section of the leaf.

== Etymology ==
The term parenchyma is Neo-Latin from the Ancient Greek word παρέγχυμα parenchyma meaning 'visceral flesh', and from παρεγχεῖν parenkhein meaning 'to pour in' from παρα- para- 'beside' + ἐν en- 'in' + χεῖν khein 'to pour'.

The word was originally used, by Erasistratus and other anatomists, for certain human tissues. Later, it was also applied to plant tissues by Nehemiah Grew.

== Structure ==
The parenchyma is the functional parts of an organ, or of a structure such as a tumour in the body. This is in contrast to the stroma, which refers to the structural tissue of organs or of structures, namely, the connective tissues.

=== Brain ===
The brain parenchyma is the functional tissue in the brain that is made up of the two types of brain cell, neurons and glial cells. It is also known to contain collagen proteins. Damage or trauma to the brain parenchyma often results in a loss of cognitive ability or even death. Bleeding into the parenchyma is known as intraparenchymal hemorrhage.

=== Lungs ===
Lung parenchyma is the substance of the lung that is involved with gas exchange and includes the pulmonary alveoli.

=== Liver ===
The liver parenchyma is the functional tissue of the organ made up of around 80% of the liver volume as hepatocytes. The other main type of liver cells are non-parenchymal. Non-parenchymal cells constitute 40% of the total number of liver cells but only 6.5% of its volume.

=== Kidneys ===
The renal parenchyma is divided into two major structures: the outer renal cortex and the inner renal medulla. Grossly, these structures take the shape of 7 to 18 cone-shaped renal lobes, each containing renal cortex surrounding a portion of medulla called a renal pyramid.

=== Tumors ===
The tumor parenchyma, of a solid tumour, is one of the two distinct compartments in a solid tumour. The parenchyma is made up of neoplastic cells. The other compartment is the stroma induced by the neoplastic cells, needed for nutritional support and waste removal. In many types of tumour, clusters of parenchymal cells are separated by a basal lamina that can sometimes be incomplete.

== Flatworms ==
Parenchyma is the tissue made up of cells and intercellular spaces that fills the interior of the body of a flatworm, which is an acoelomate. This is a spongy tissue also known as a mesenchymal tissue, in which several types of cells are lodged in their extracellular matrices. The parenchymal cells include myocytes, and many types of specialised cells. The cells are often attached to each other and also to their nearby epithelial cells mainly by gap junctions and hemidesmosomes. There is much variation in the types of cell in the parenchyma according to the species and anatomical regions. Its possible functions may include skeletal support, nutrient storage, movement, and many others.
