= Arcuate artery =

Arcuate artery can refer to:

- Arcuate artery of the foot
- Arcuate arteries of the kidney
- Arcuate vessels of uterus
