= Medullary ray (anatomy) =

Middle part of the cortical lobule or renal lobule

Details
- System: Urinary system

Identifiers
- Latin: radii medullares
- TA98: A08.1.01.018
- TA2: 3378
- FMA: 74299

In anatomy, a medullary ray (Ferrein's pyramid) is the middle part of a renal lobule. Each consists of a group of nephrons in the renal cortex. Their name is potentially misleading, as "medullary" refers to their destination, not their location. They travel perpendicular to the capsule, and extend from the cortex to the medulla. They may be visualised during urography.

== Additional images ==
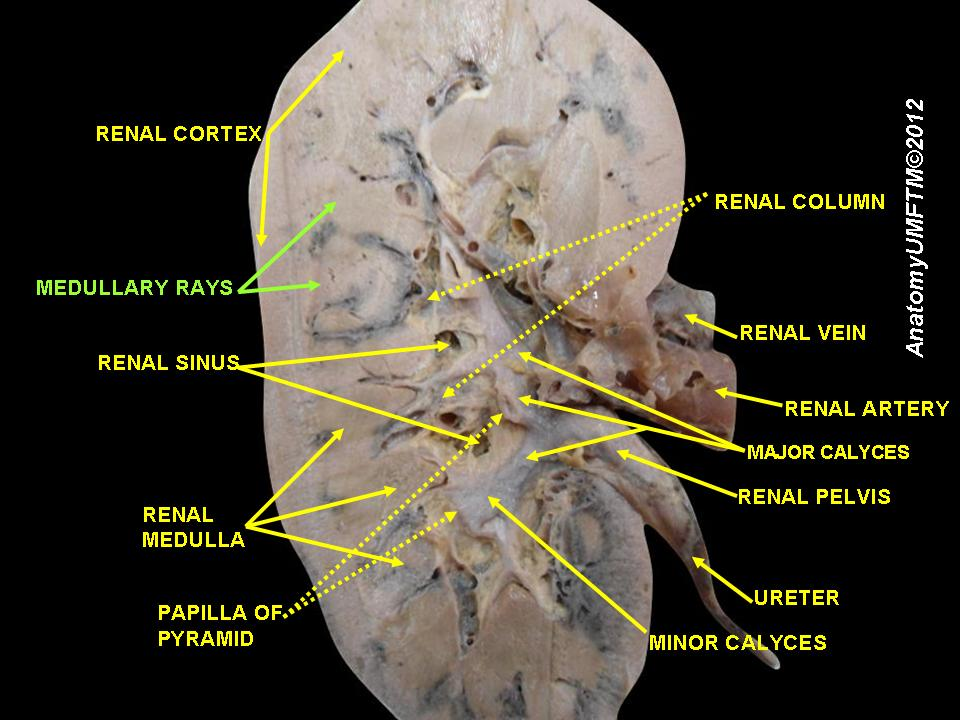
Medullary rays

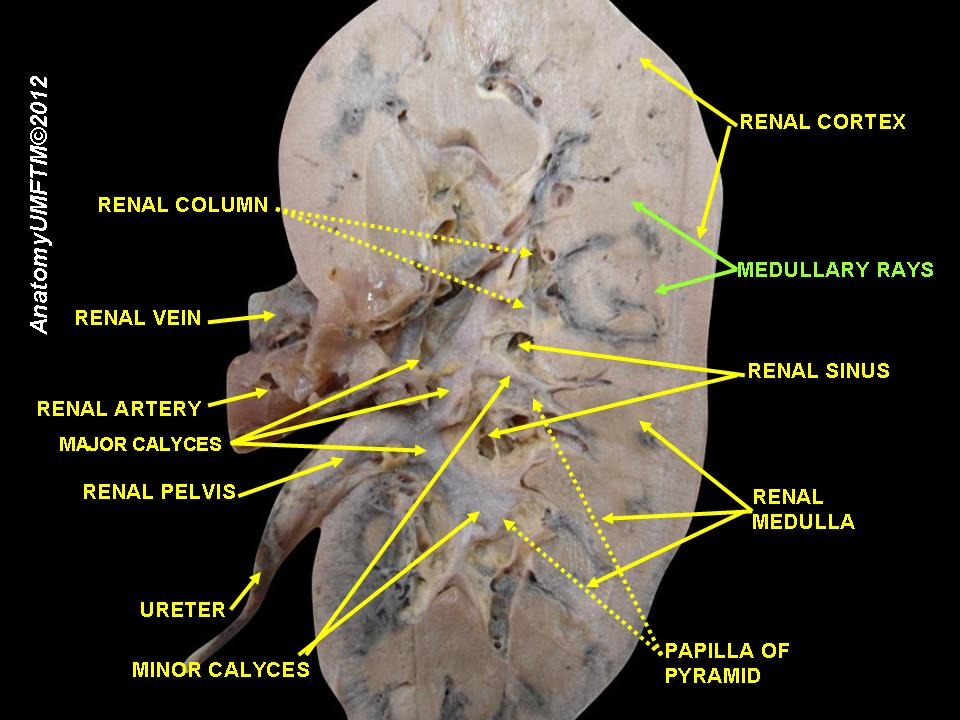
Medullary rays
