= Interlobar veins =

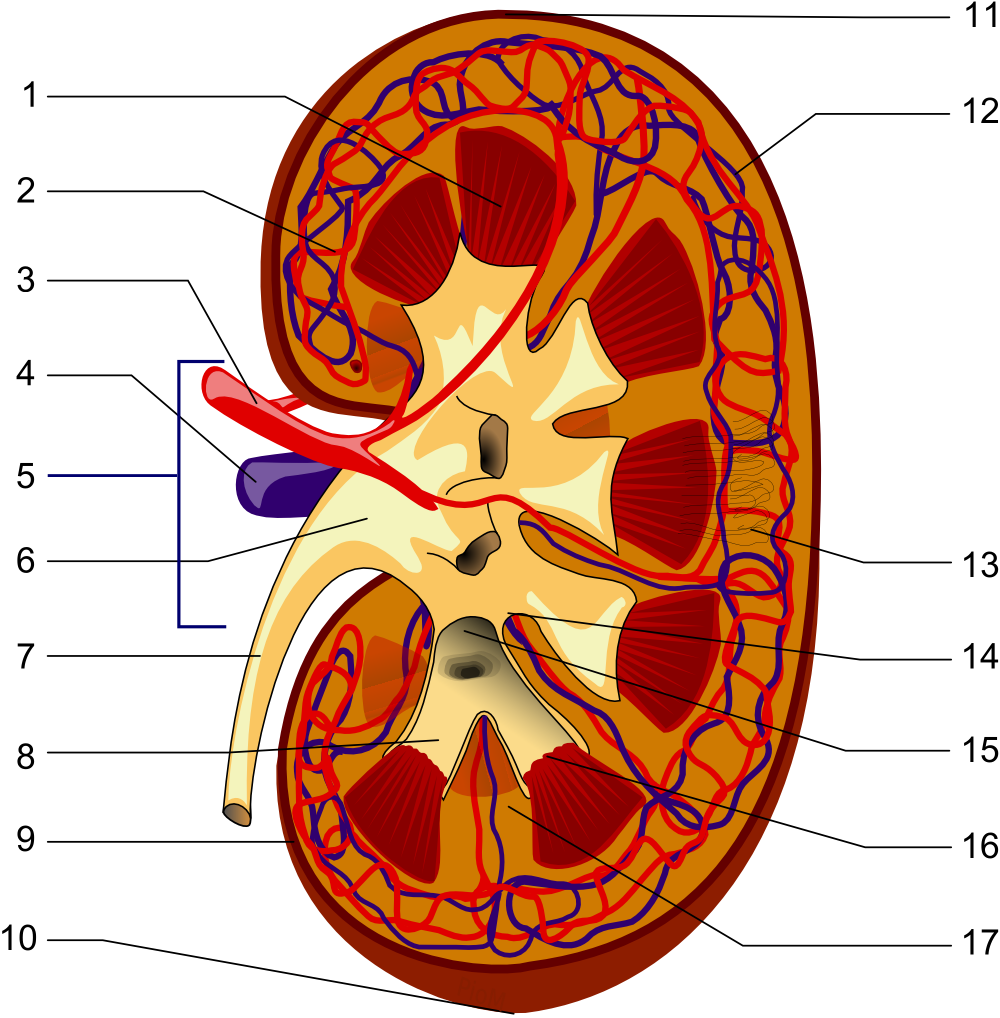
- Interlobar veins visible and in the area marked 17..

Details
- Source: Arcuate veins
- Drains to: Renal vein
- Artery: Interlobar arteries

Identifiers
- Latin: venae interlobares renis
- TA98: A08.1.04.002
- TA2: 5003, 5009
- FMA: 71631

The interlobar veins are veins of the renal circulation which drain the renal lobes. They collect blood from the arcuate veins. The interlobar veins unite to form a renal vein. Each interlobar vein passes along the edge of the renal pyramids.
