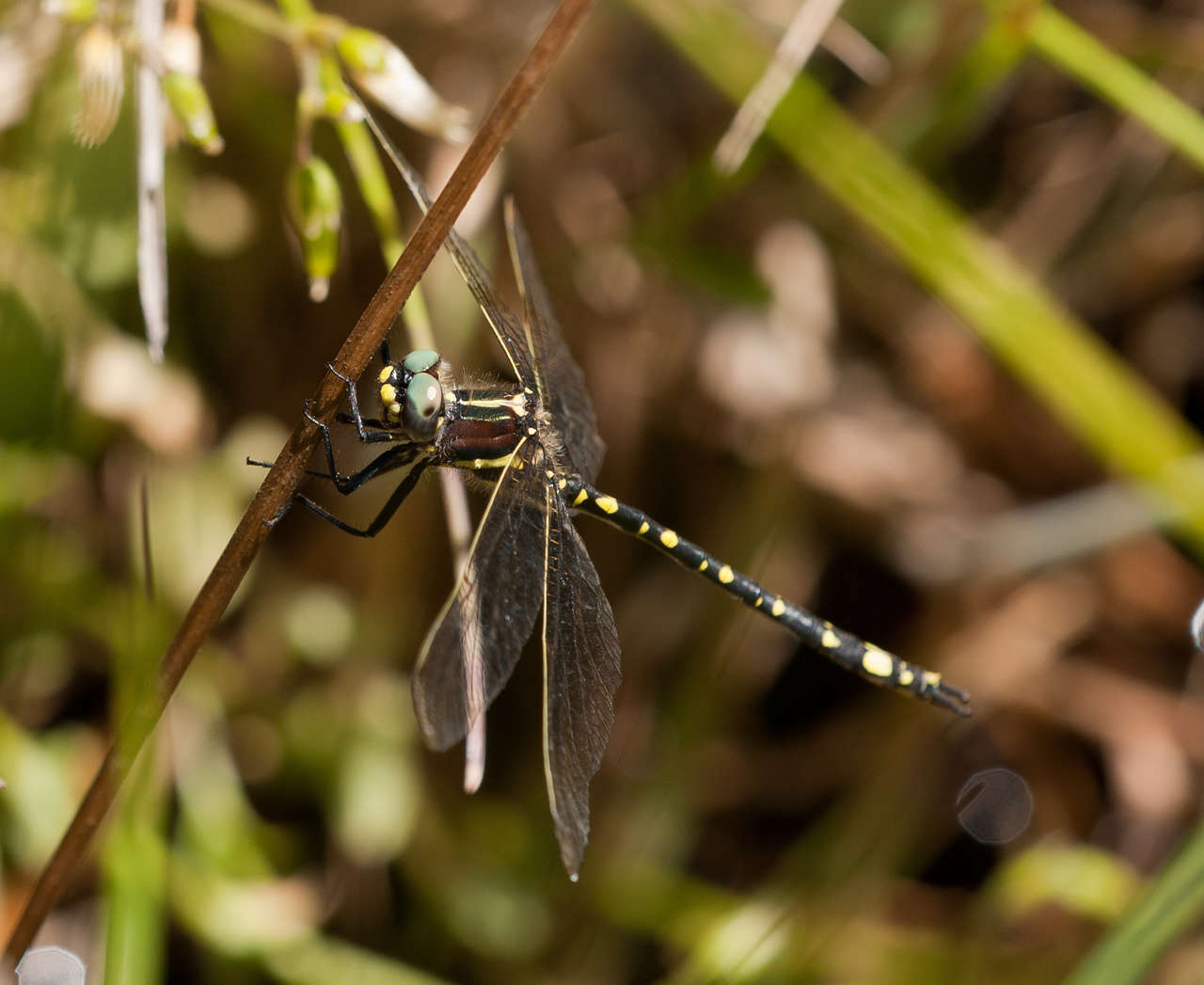
- Male

Conservation status
- Least Concern (IUCN 3.1)

Scientific classification
- Kingdom: Animalia
- Phylum: Arthropoda
- Clade: Pancrustacea
- Class: Insecta
- Order: Odonata
- Suborder: Anisoptera
- Superfamily: Libelluloidea
- Family: Synthemistidae
- Genus: Synthemis
- Species: S. eustalacta

Binomial name
- Synthemis eustalacta (Burmeister, 1839)

Synonyms
- Epophthalmia eustalacta Burmeister, 1839

= Synthemis eustalacta =

Swamp tigertail

Species of dragonfly

Synthemis eustalacta is a species of dragonfly in the family Synthemistidae, known as the swamp tigertail. It is found in south-eastern Australia, where it inhabits streams and rivers. It is a slender, medium-sized dragonfly with black and yellow markings.

== Etymology ==
The genus name Synthemis is derived from the Greek σύν (syn, "together") and -themis, from Greek Θέμις (Themis), the goddess of divine law, order and justice. In early odonate taxonomy, names ending in -themis were introduced by Hagen and were widely used for dragonflies.

The species name eustalacta is derived from the Greek εὖ (eu, "well") and σταλακτός (stalaktos, "droplet" or "spotted with drops"), referring to the yellow drop-like markings on the abdomen.

== Gallery ==
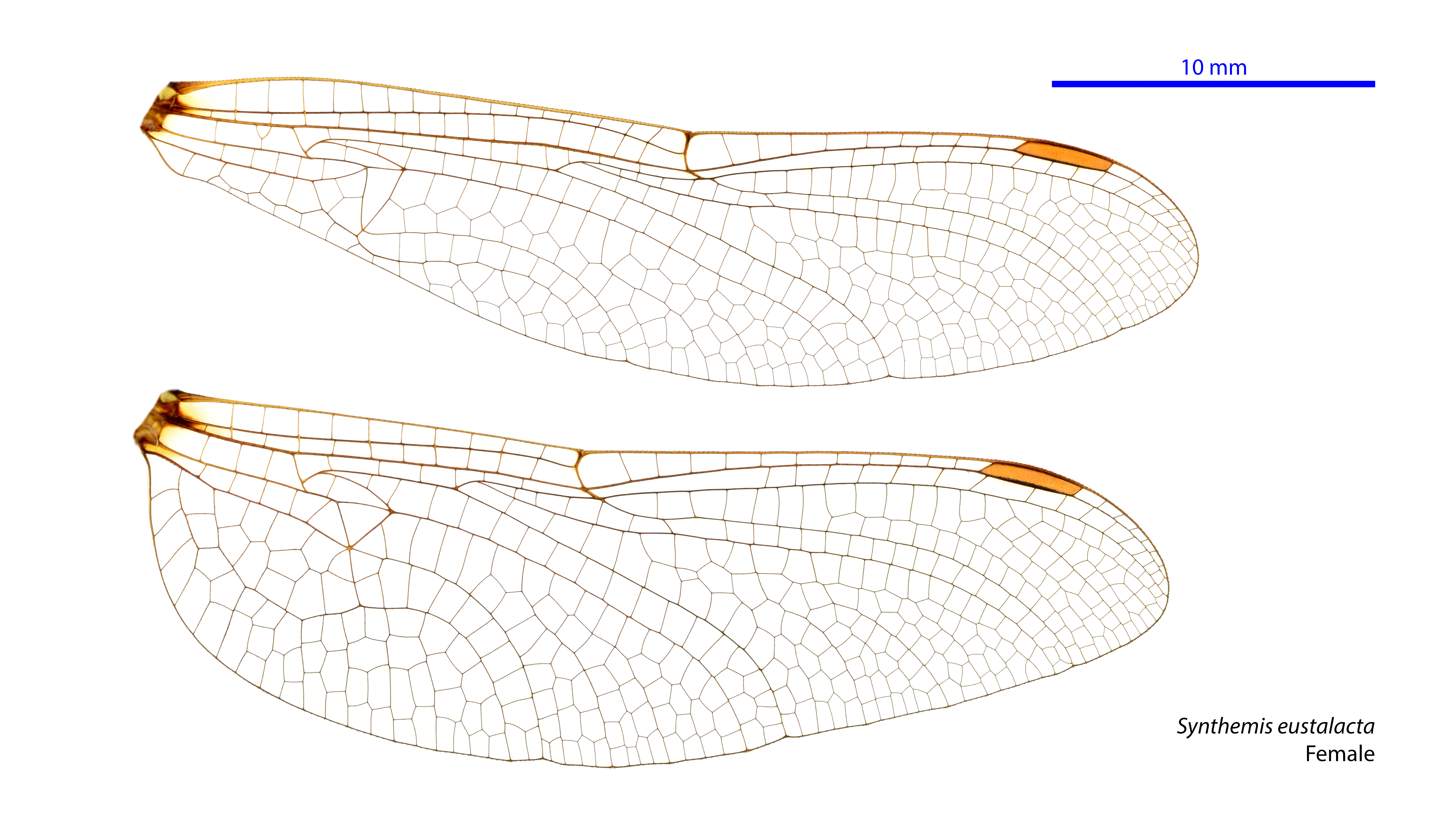
Female wings

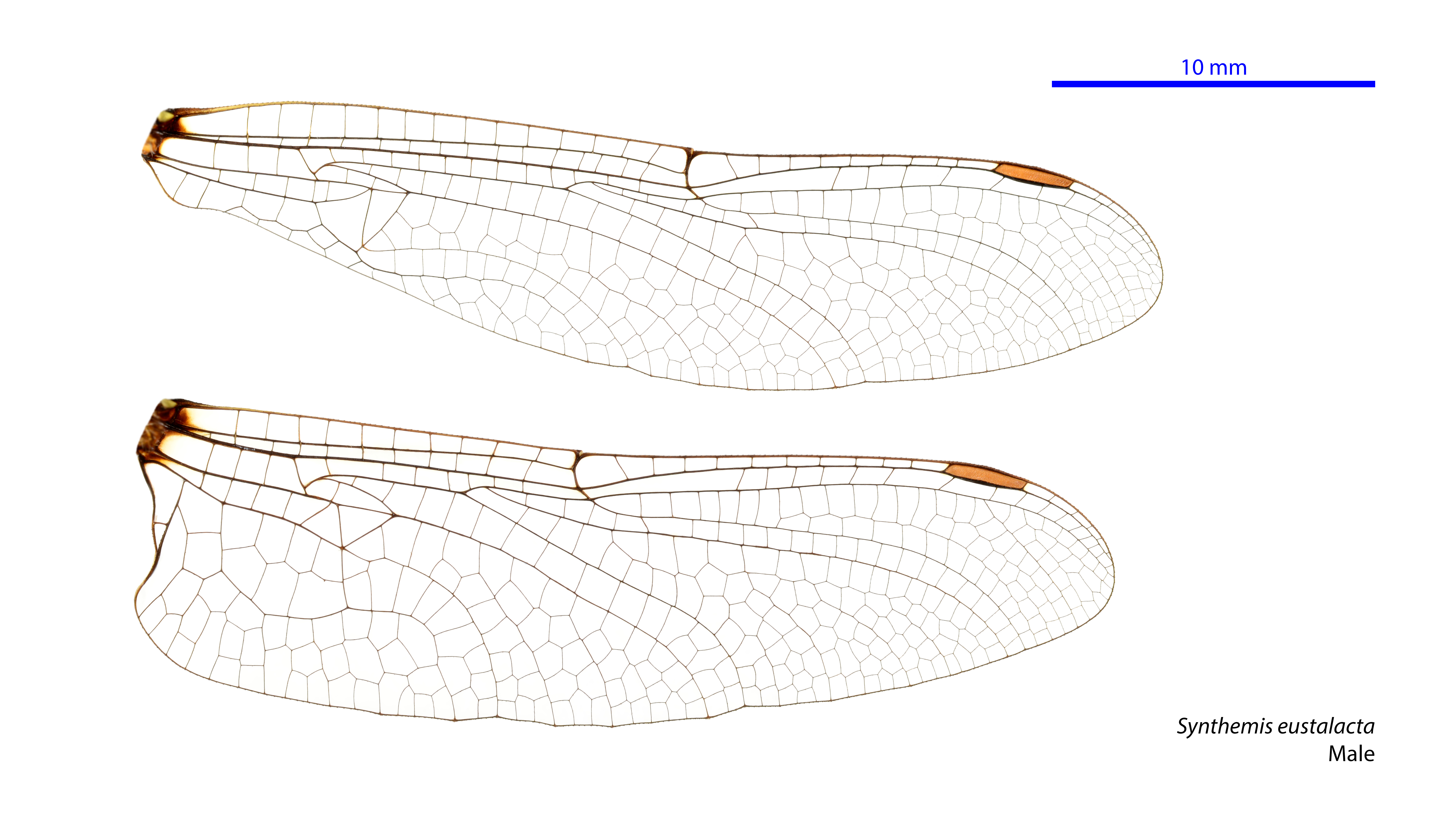
Male wings

== See also ==
- List of Odonata species of Australia
