= Lobe (anatomy) =

Clear anatomical division of an organ visible with naked eyes

Lobes
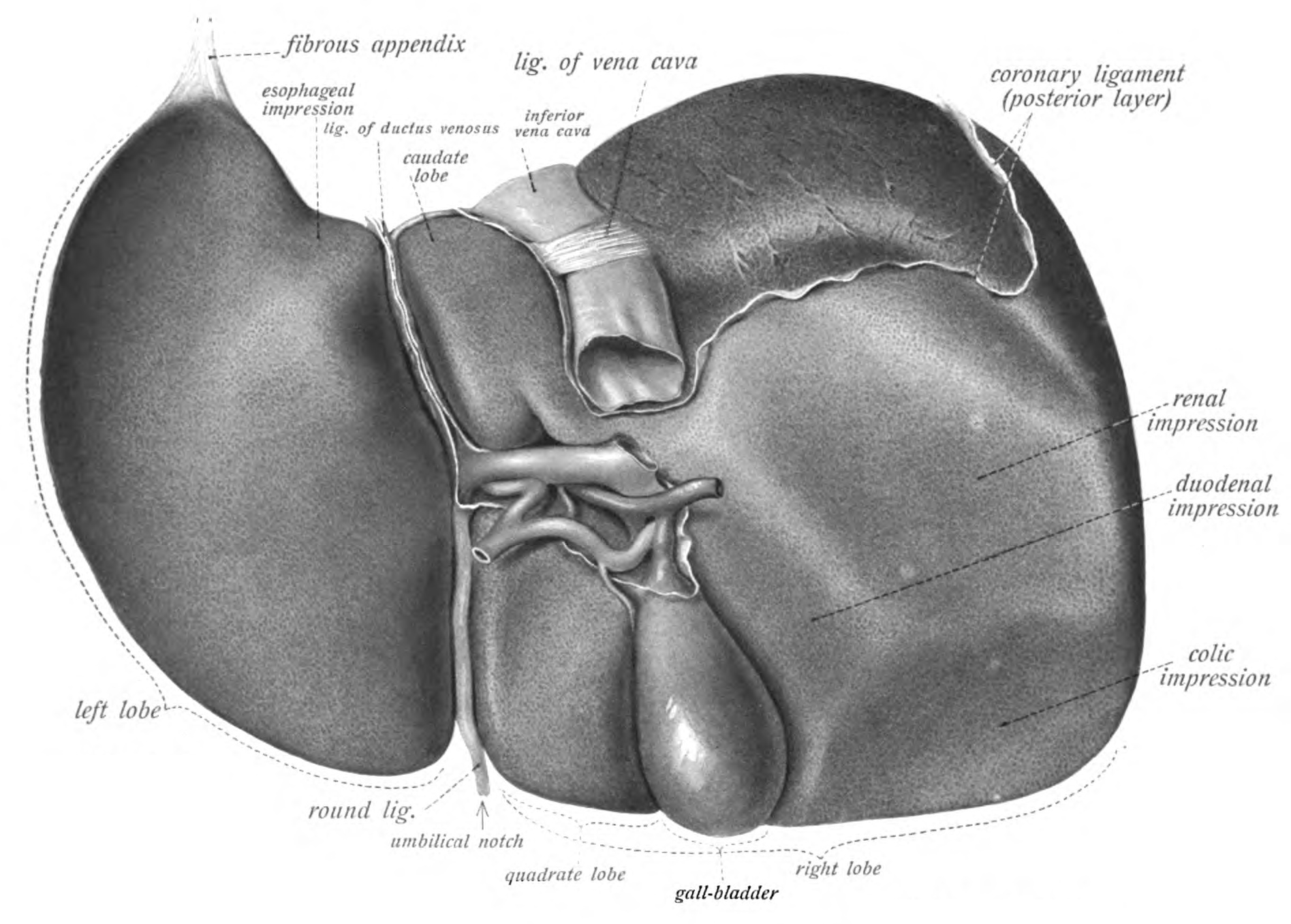
- Visceral surface of the liver showing the four lobes

Identifiers
- TA98: A13.1.02.002
- FMA: 45728

In anatomy, a lobe is a clear anatomical division or extension of an organ (as seen for example in the brain, lung, liver, or kidney) that can be determined without the use of a microscope at the gross anatomy level. This is in contrast to the much smaller lobule, which is a clear division only visible under the microscope.

Interlobar ducts connect lobes and interlobular ducts connect lobules.

== Examples of lobes ==
- The four main lobes of the brain
  - the frontal lobe
  - the parietal lobe
  - the occipital lobe
  - the temporal lobe
- The three lobes of the human cerebellum
  - the flocculonodular lobe
  - the anterior lobe
  - the posterior lobe
- The two lobes of the thymus
- The two and three lobes of the lungs
  - Left lung: superior and inferior
  - Right lung: superior, middle, and inferior
- The four lobes of the liver
  - Left lobe of liver
  - Right lobe of liver
  - Quadrate lobe of liver
  - Caudate lobe of liver
- The renal lobes of the kidney
- Earlobes

=== Examples of lobules ===
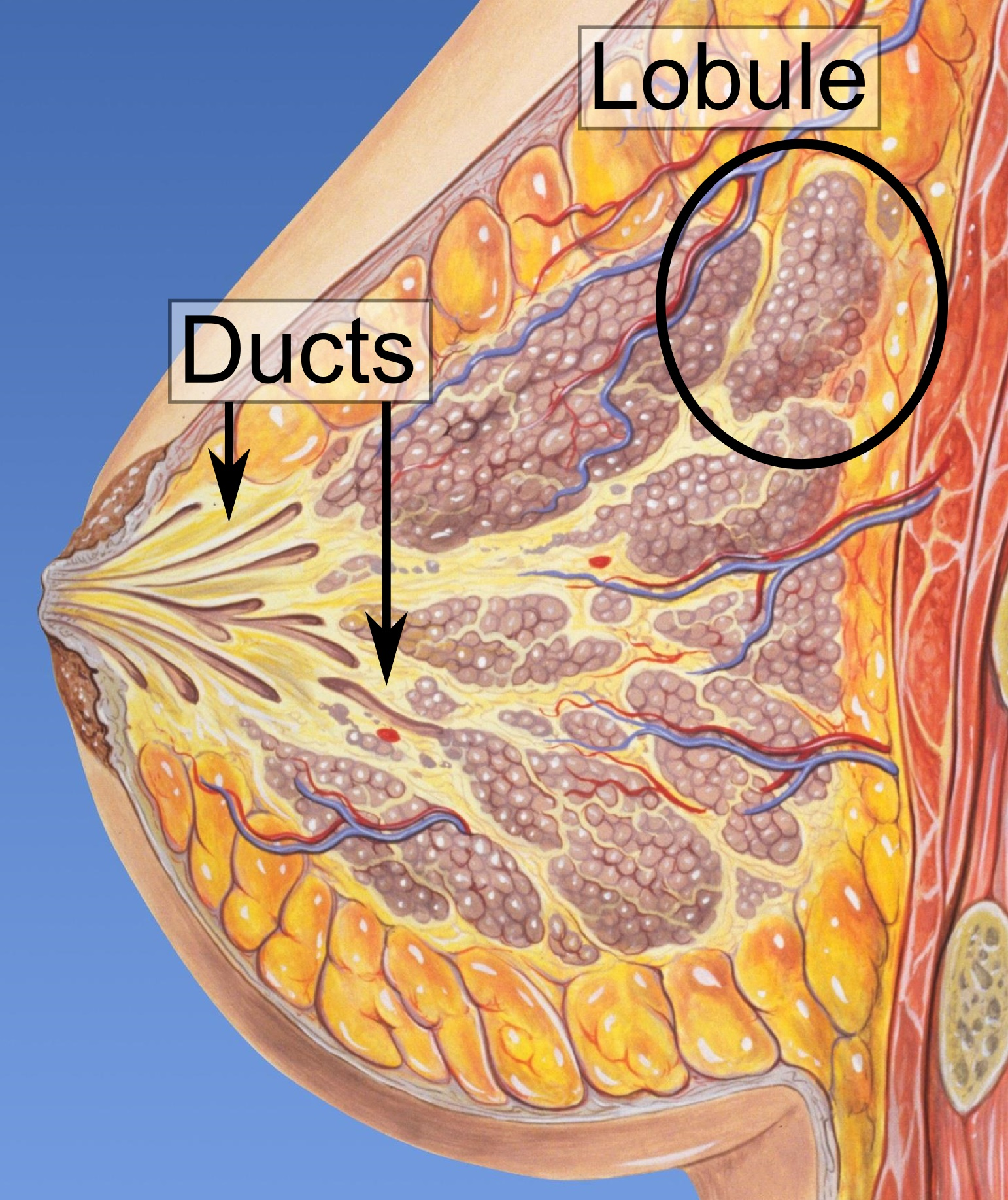
Lobules of the mammary glands.

- the cortical lobules of the kidney
- the testicular lobules of the testis
- the lobules of the mammary gland
- the pulmonary lobules of the lung
- the lobules of the thymus
