= Arcuate line =

In anatomy, an arcuate line is any structure that is curvilinear.

- Arcuate line (anterior abdominal wall), a term from human abdominal anatomy
- Arcuate line (ilium), the inner edge of the pelvis

== See also ==
- Arcuate (disambiguation)
