= Arcuate ligament =

The arcuate ligament may refer to:

- Inferior pubic ligament (arcuate ligament of the pubis).
- Arcuate popliteal ligament.
- Arcuate ligaments of the diaphragm:
  - Median arcuate ligament
  - Medial arcuate ligament
  - Lateral arcuate ligament
