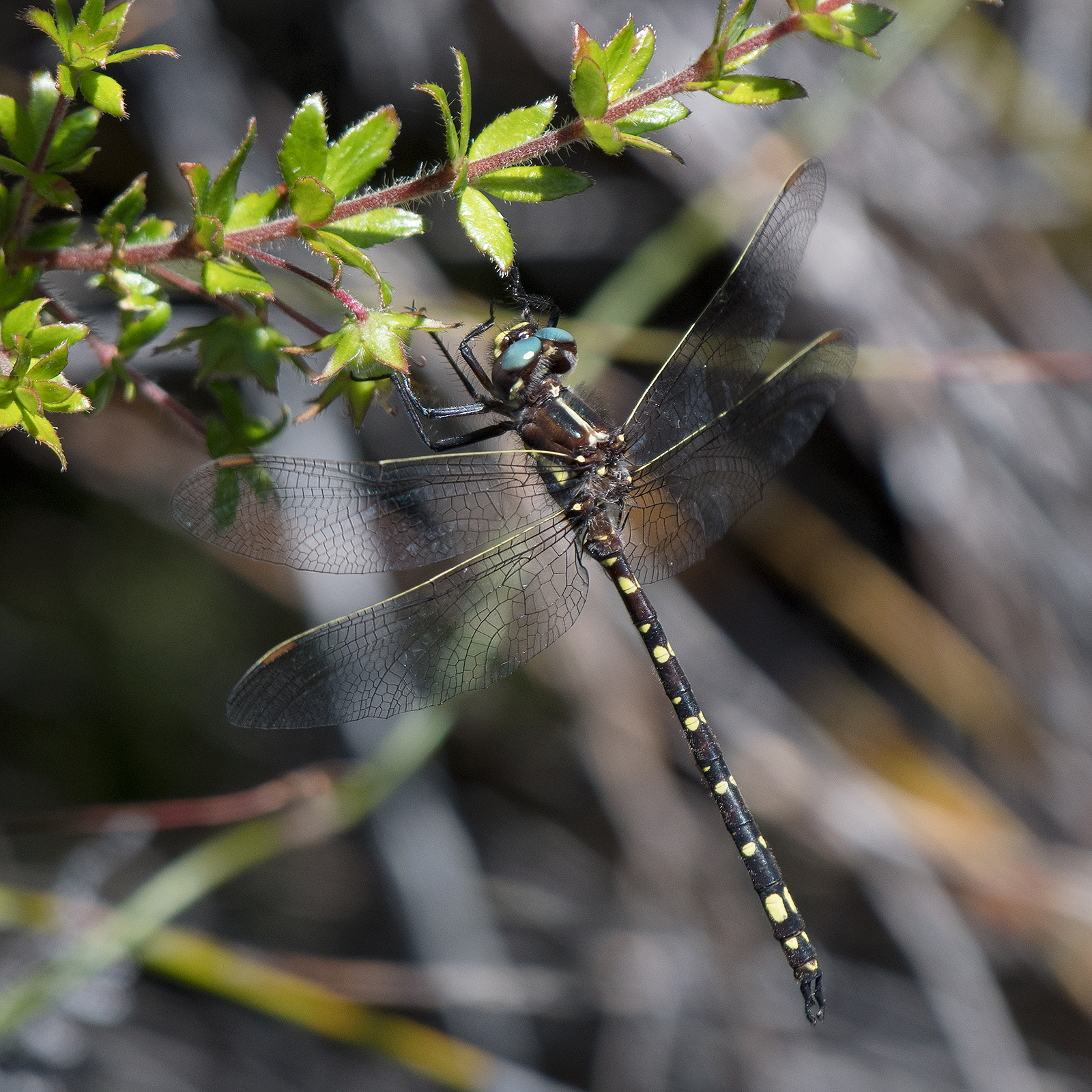
- Male
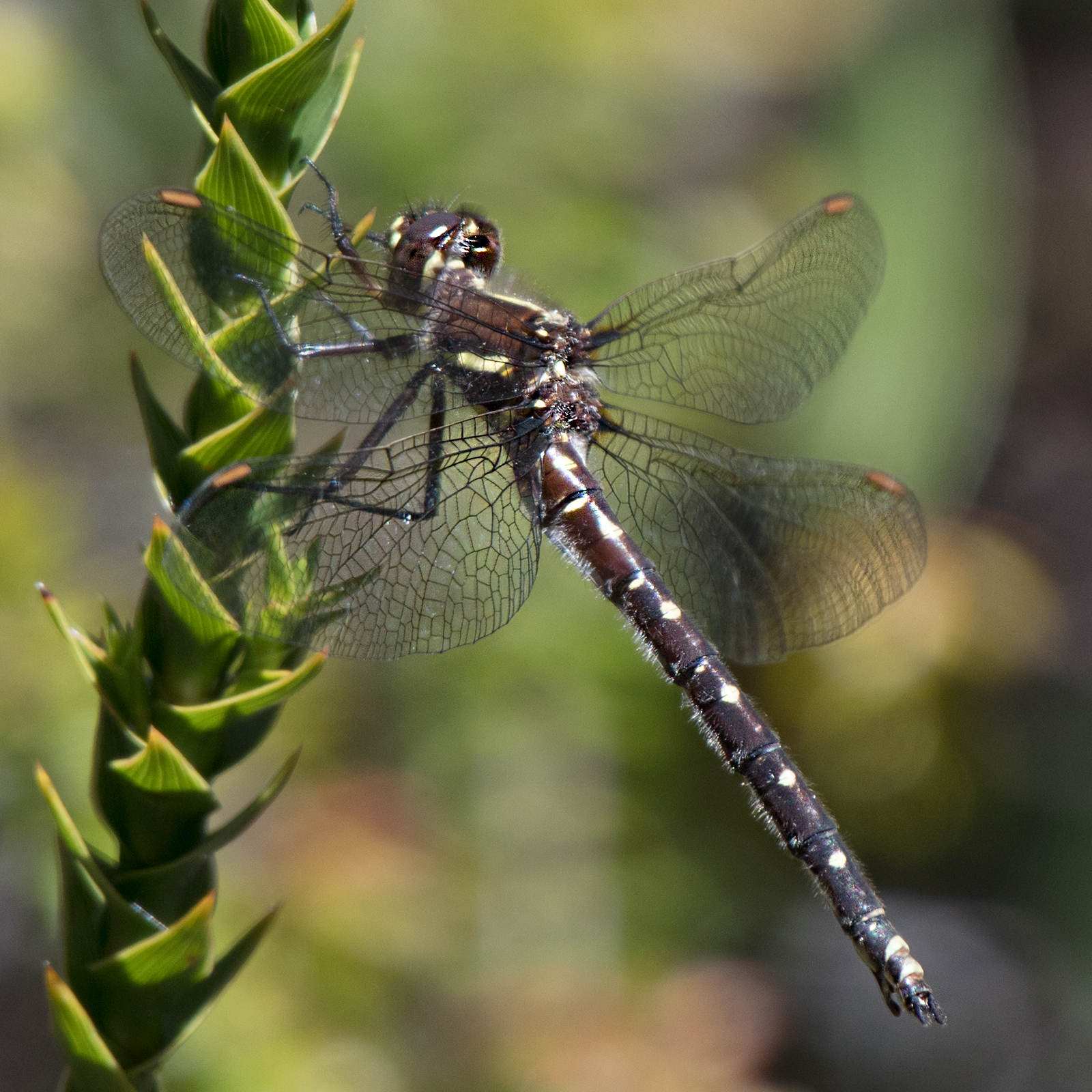
- Female

Conservation status
- Least Concern (IUCN 3.1)

Scientific classification
- Kingdom: Animalia
- Phylum: Arthropoda
- Clade: Pancrustacea
- Class: Insecta
- Order: Odonata
- Suborder: Anisoptera
- Superfamily: Libelluloidea
- Family: Synthemistidae
- Genus: Synthemis
- Species: S. tasmanica

Binomial name
- Synthemis tasmanica Tillyard, 1910

= Synthemis tasmanica =

Tasmanian swamp tigertail

Species of dragonfly

Synthemis tasmanica is a species of dragonfly in the family Synthemistidae, known as the Tasmanian swamp tigertail. It is found in Tasmania, Australia, where it inhabits seepages and bogs. It is a slender, medium-sized dragonfly with black and yellow markings.

== Etymology ==
The genus name Synthemis is derived from the Greek σύν (syn, "together") and -themis, from Greek Θέμις (Themis), the goddess of divine law, order and justice. In early odonate taxonomy, names ending in -themis were introduced by Hagen and were widely used for dragonflies.

The species name tasmanica is named for Tasmania, where this species occurs.

== Gallery ==
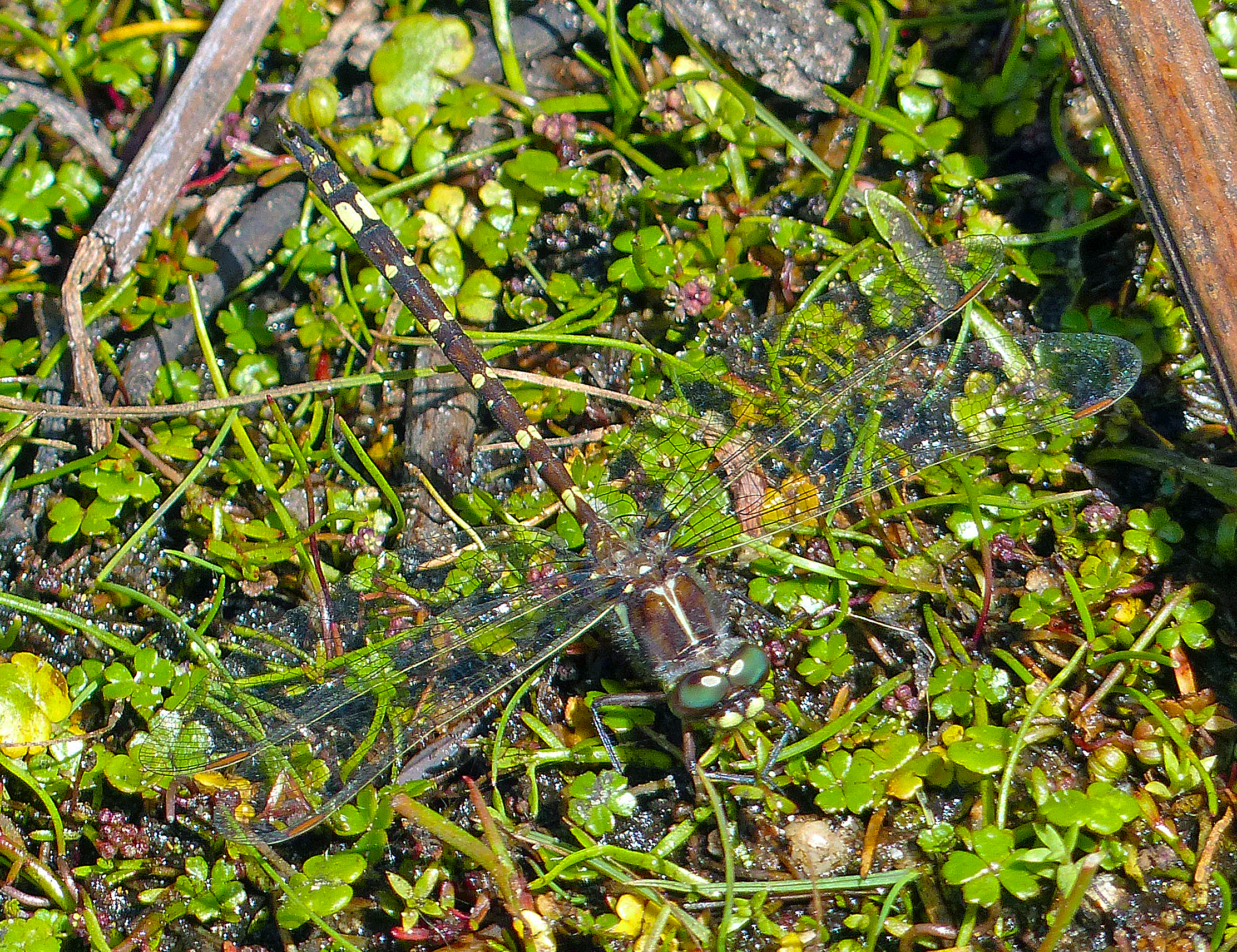
Male

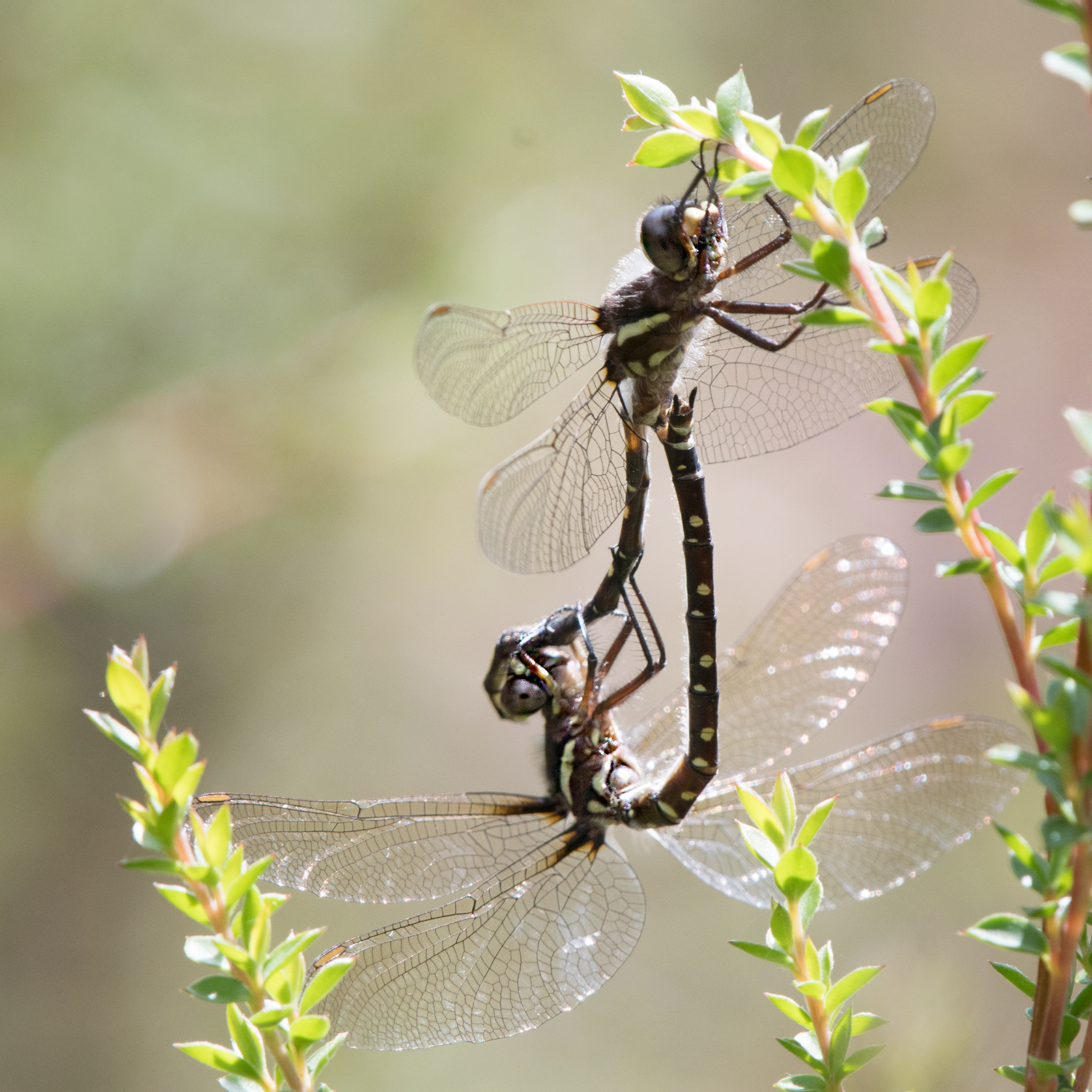
Mating pair, female is upside down

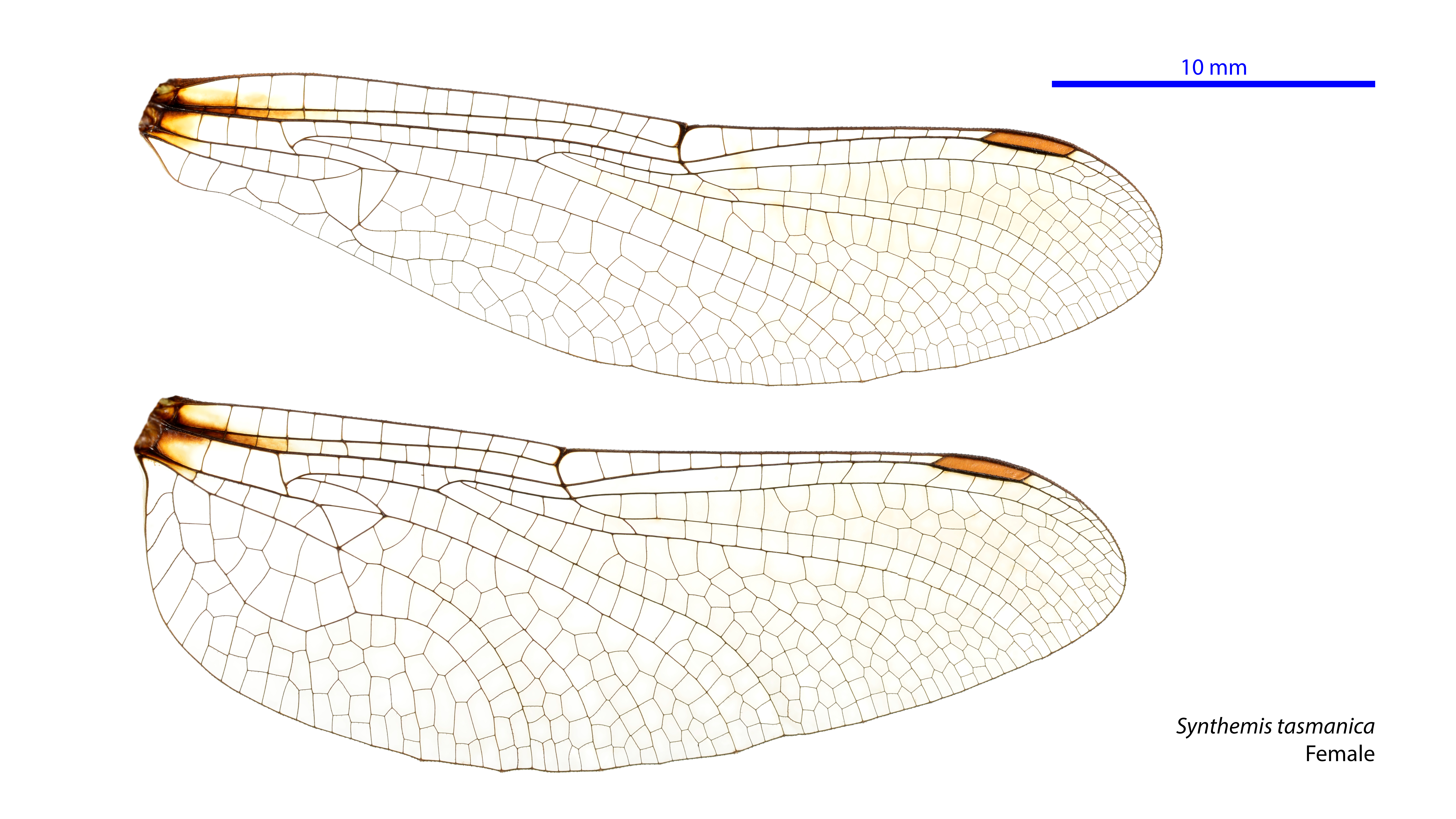
Female wings

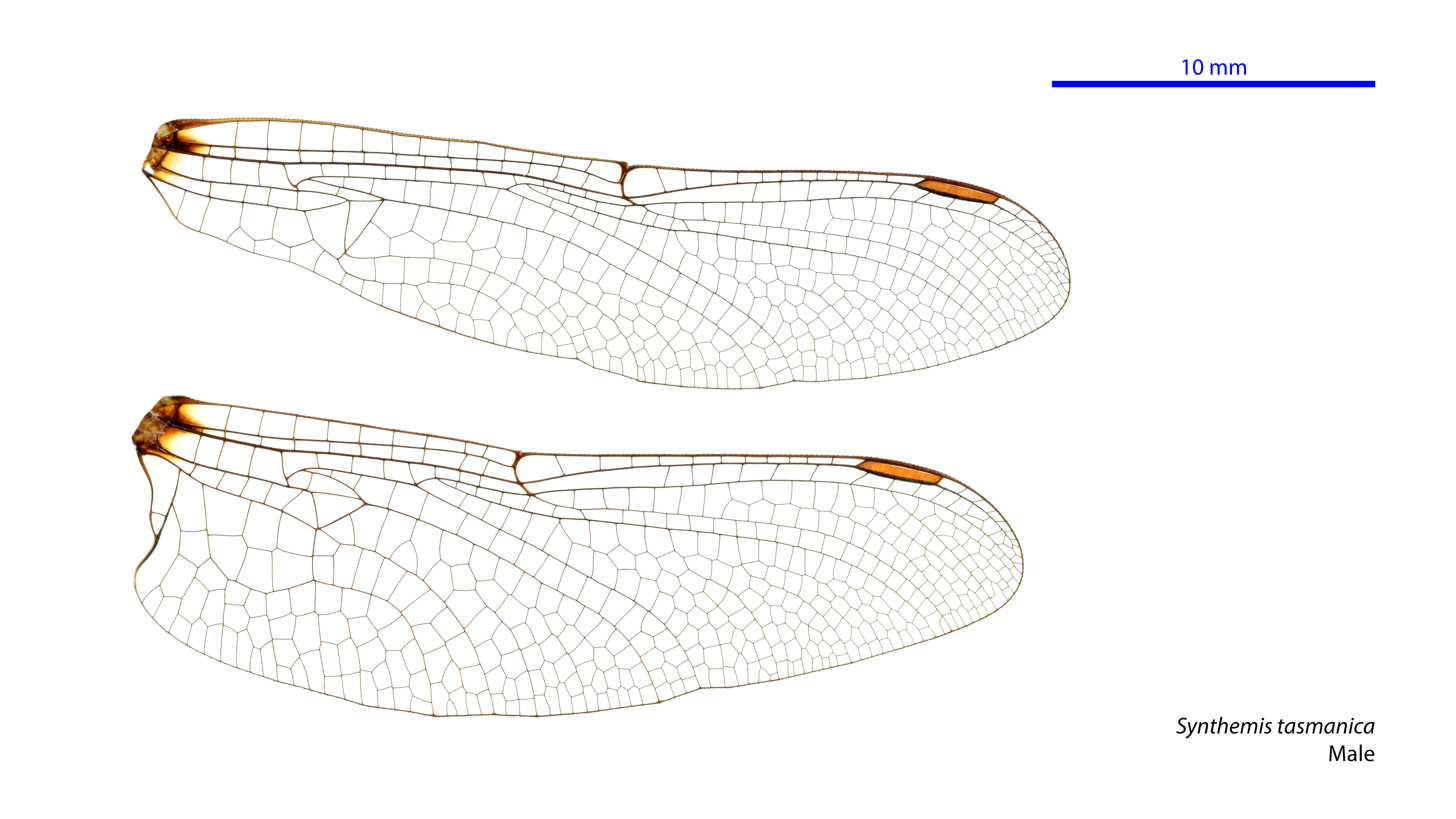
Male wings

== See also ==
- List of Odonata species of Australia
