= Arcuate arteries of the kidney =

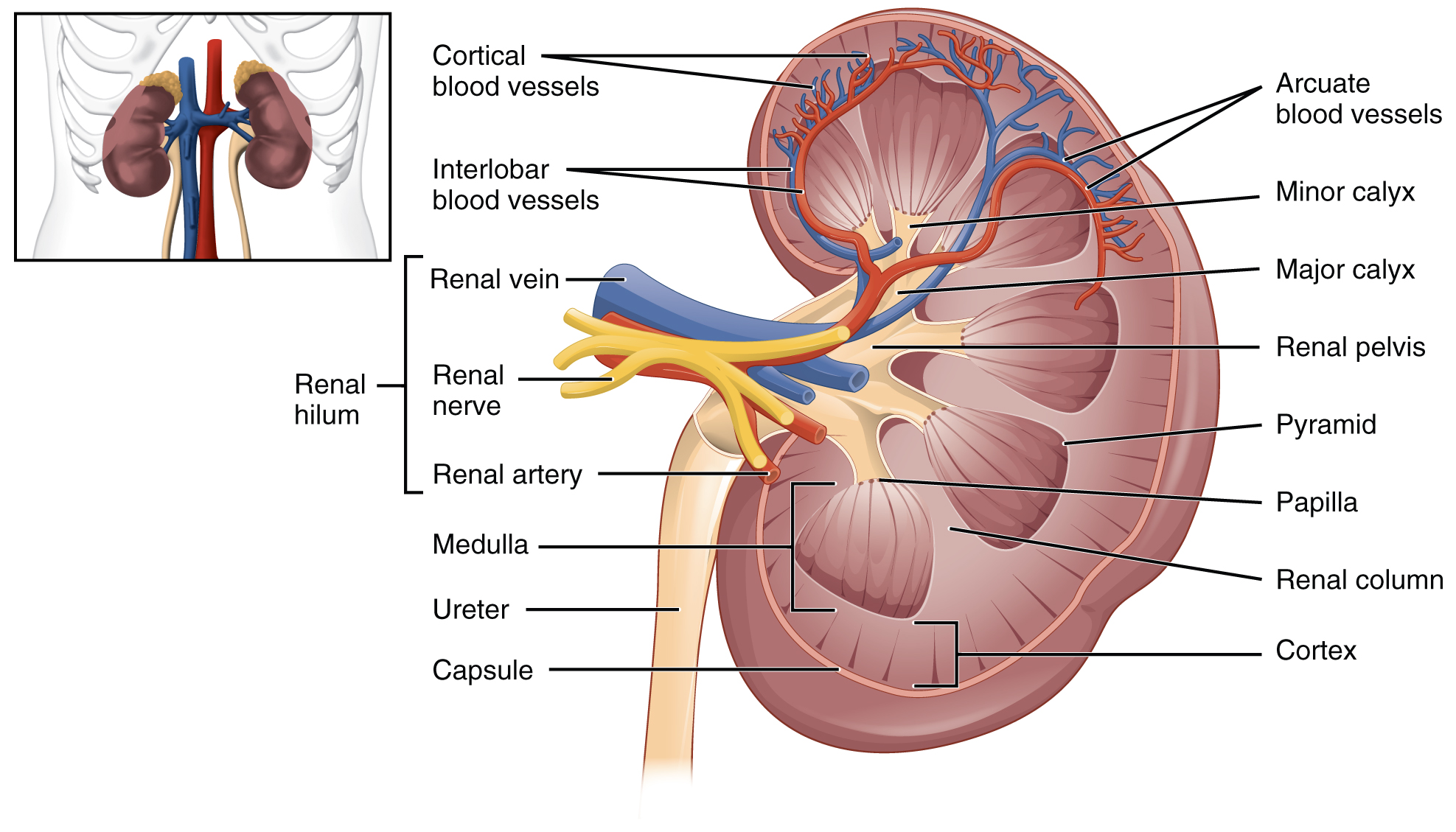
- Diagram of kidney, with arcuate arteries being the red-colored vessels among the "Arcuate blood vessels" labeled at top right.

Details
- Source: Interlobar artery
- Branches: Vasa recta and interlobular arteries
- Vein: Arcuate vein

Identifiers
- Latin: Arteriae arcuatae renis
- TA98: A08.1.03.003
- TA2: 4282
- FMA: 70497

The arcuate arteries of the kidney, also known as arciform arteries, are vessels of the renal circulation. They are located at the border of the renal cortex and renal medulla.

They are named after the fact that they are shaped in arcs due to the nature of the shape of the renal medulla.

Arcuate arteries arise from renal interlobar arteries.
