= Arcuate vein =

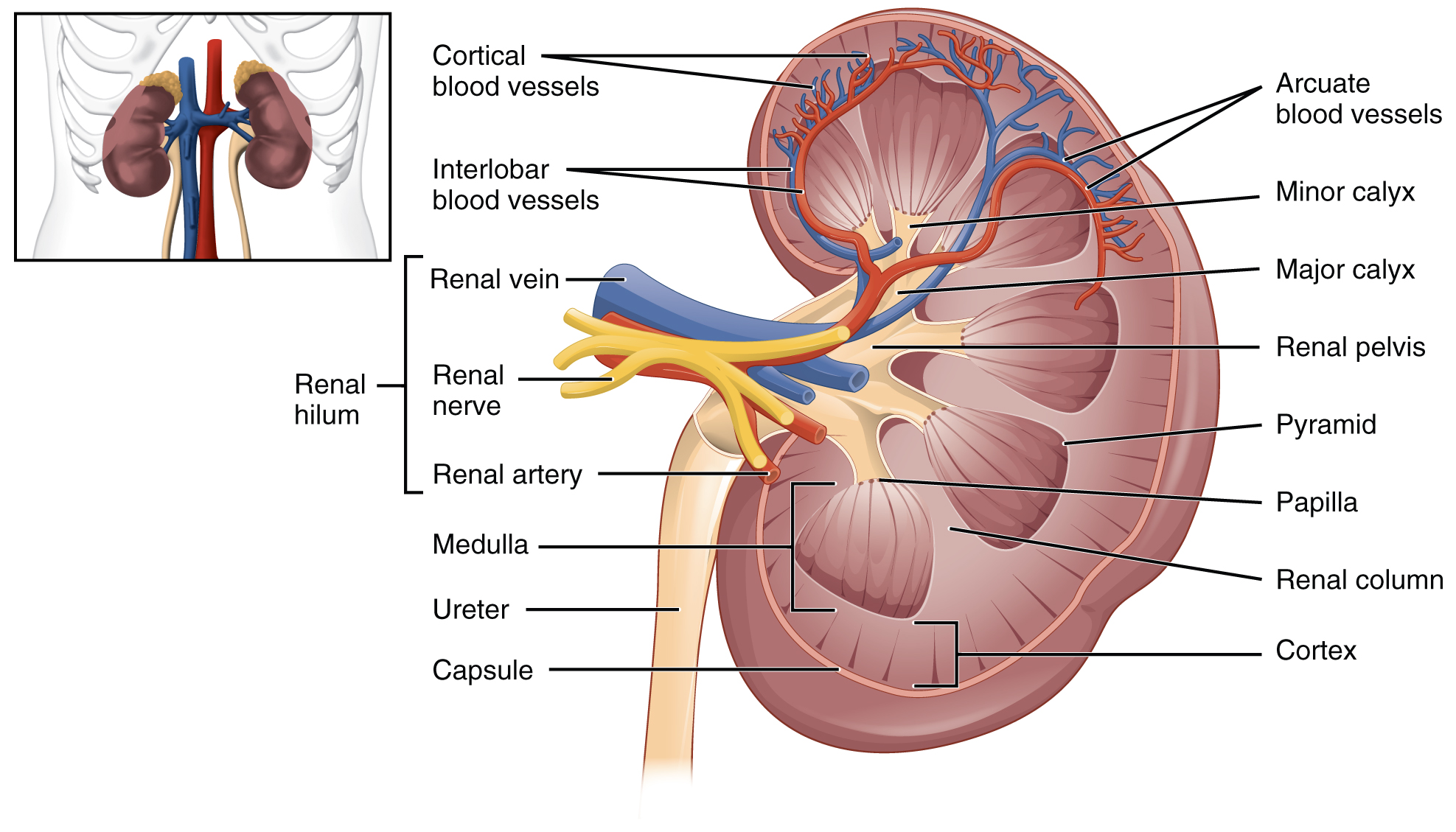
- Diagram of kidney, with arcuate veins being the blue-colored vessels among the "Arcuate blood vessels" labeled at top right.

Details
- Source: Interlobular veins and straight venules
- Drains to: Interlobar vein
- Artery: Arcuate artery

Identifiers
- Latin: Venae arcuatae renis (plural)
- TA98: A08.1.04.003
- TA2: 5004, 5010
- FMA: 71632

The arcuate vein is a vessel of the renal circulation. It is located at the border of the renal cortex and renal medulla. Arcuate veins pass around the renal pyramids at the border between the renal cortex and renal medulla in an arch shape. Arcuate veins receive blood from cortical radiate veins, and in turn deliver blood into the arcuate veins.
