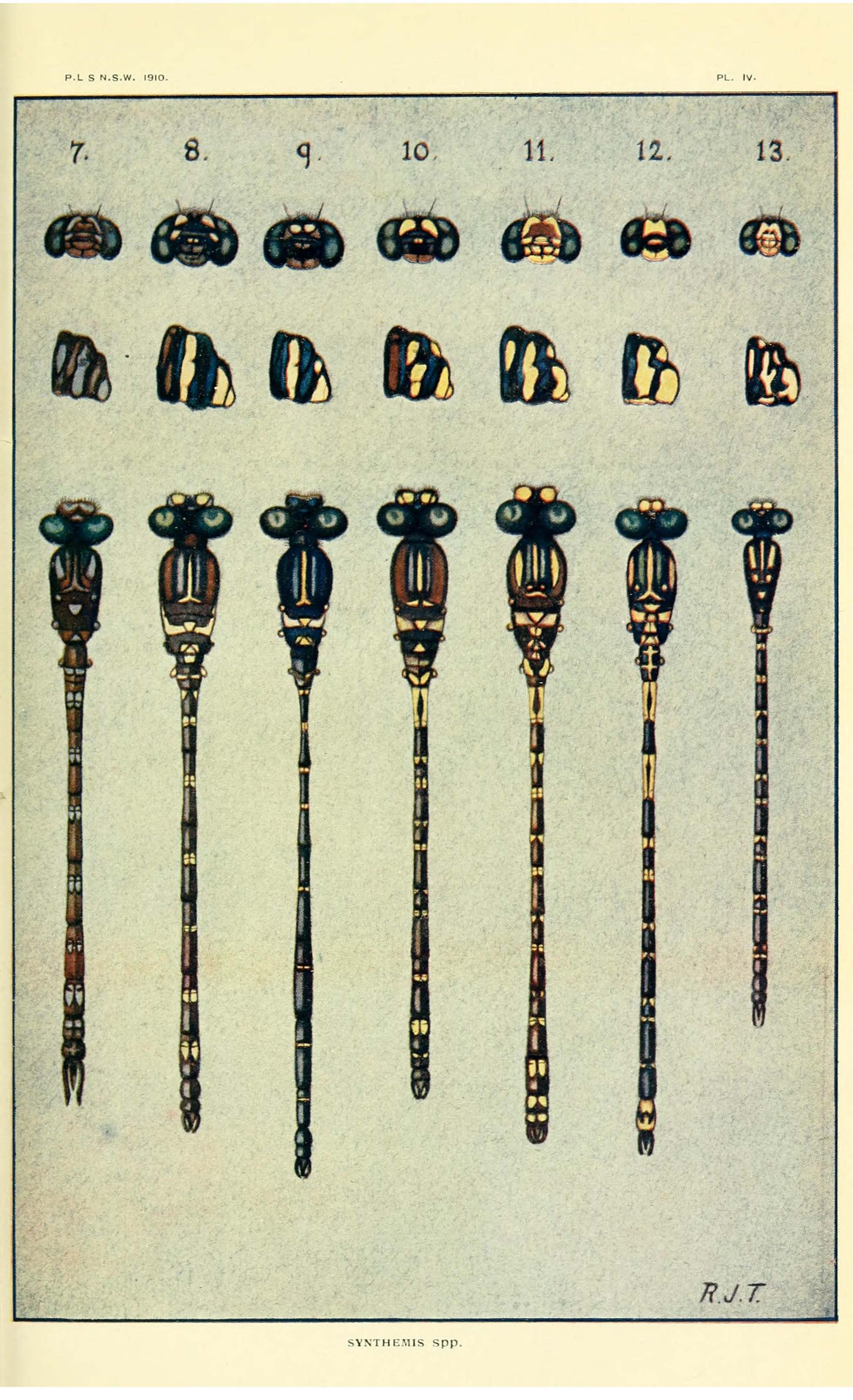

Scientific classification
- Kingdom: Animalia
- Phylum: Arthropoda
- Clade: Pancrustacea
- Class: Insecta
- Order: Odonata
- Infraorder: Anisoptera
- Family: Synthemistidae
- Genus: Synthemis; Selys, 1870

= Synthemis =

Genus of dragonflies

Synthemis is a genus of dragonflies in the family Synthemistidae. Species of Synthemis are medium-sized, slender, black and yellow dragonflies.

== Species ==
The genus includes these species:

- Synthemis eustalacta (Burmeister, 1839) - swamp tigertail
- Synthemis tasmanica Tillyard, 1910 - Tasmanian swamp tigertail

== Etymology ==
The genus name Synthemis is derived from the Greek σύν (syn, "together") and -themis, from Greek Θέμις (Themis), the goddess of divine law, order and justice. In early odonate taxonomy, names ending in -themis were introduced by Hagen and were widely used for dragonflies.

== Gallery ==
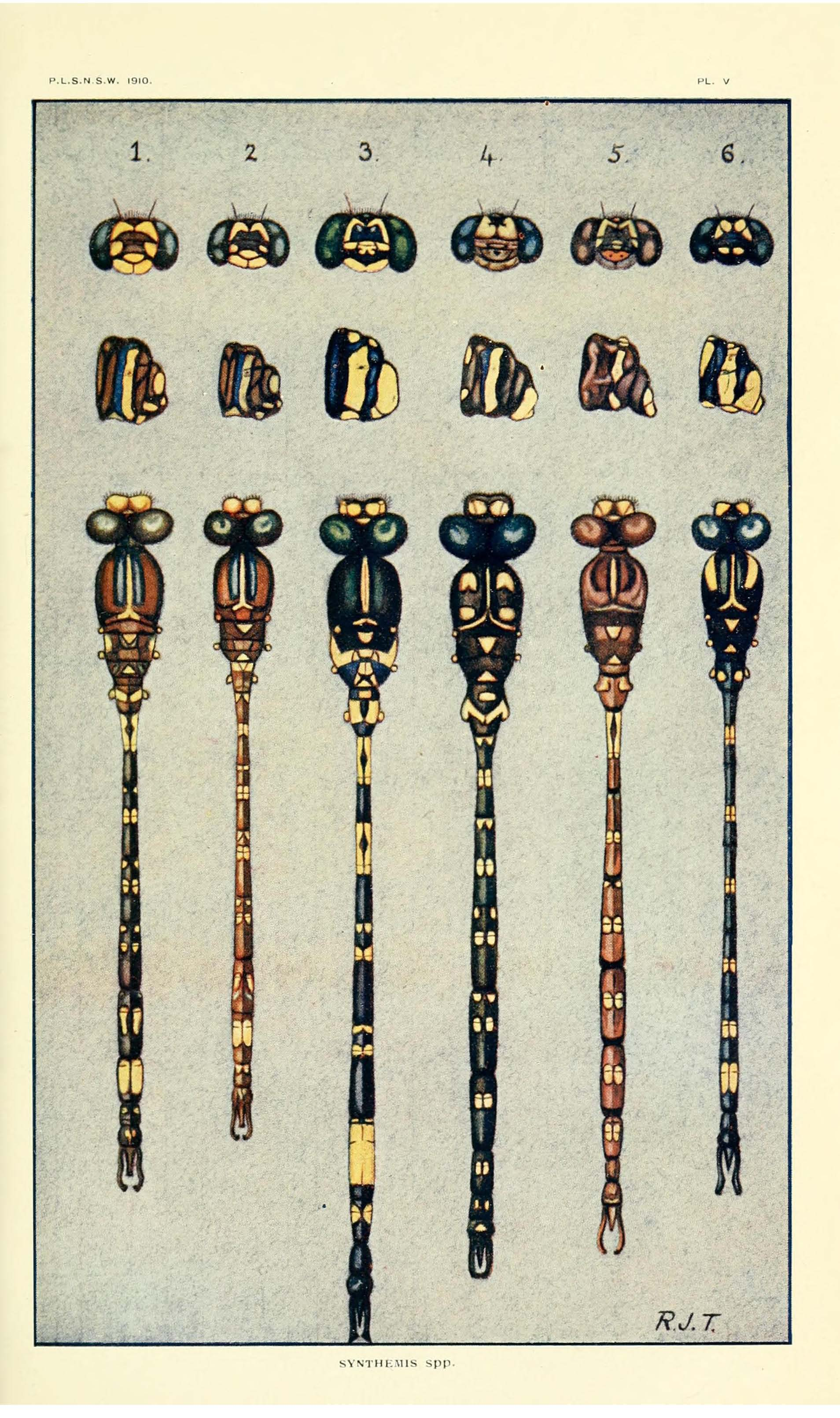
1.Synthemis eustalacta, 2.Synthemis tasmanica, 5.Synthemis macrostigma

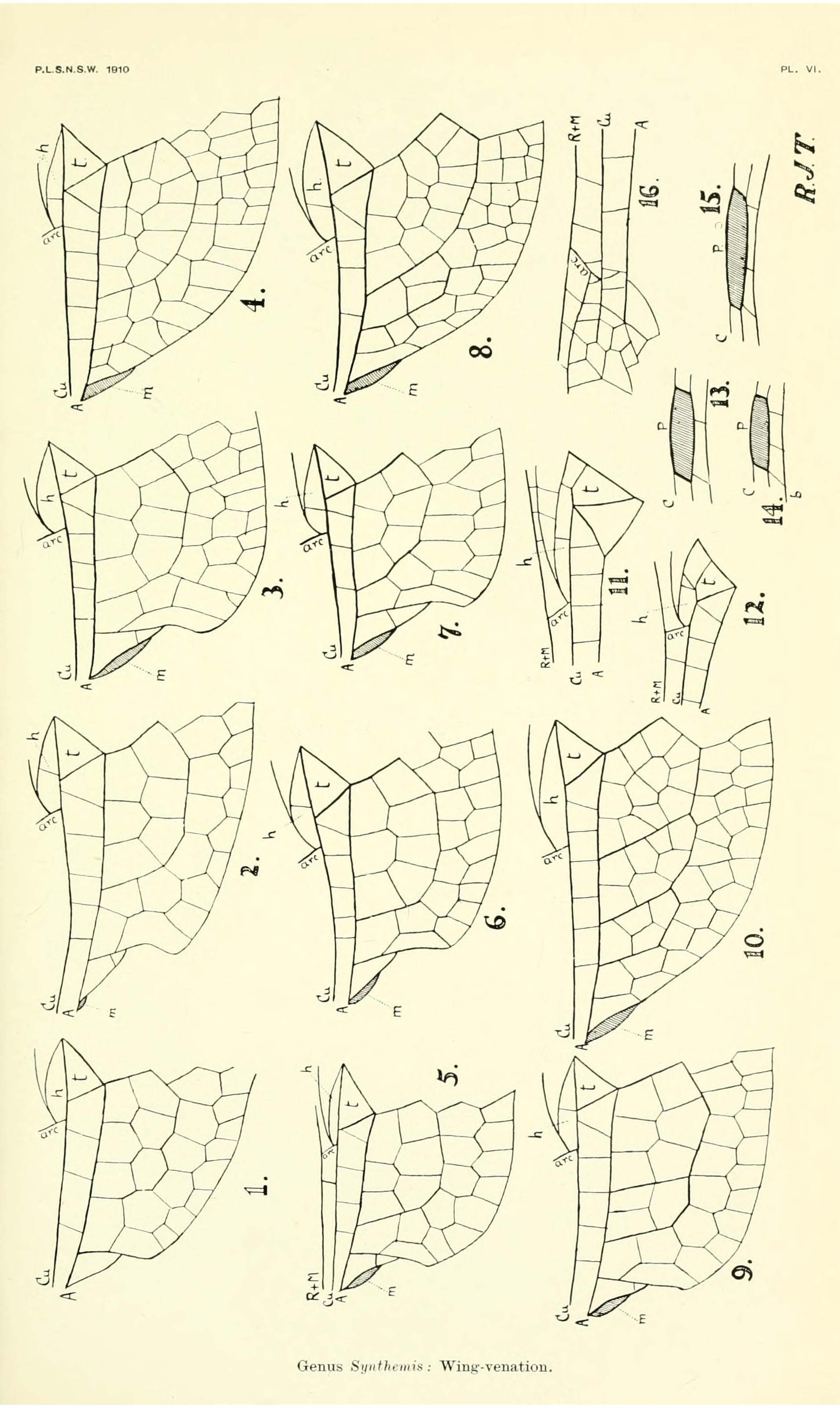
Wing venation 3.Synthemis eustalacta male, 4.Synthemis eustalacta female, 7.Synthemis macrostigma male, 8.Synthemis macrostigma female, 15.Synthemis macrostigma pterostigma

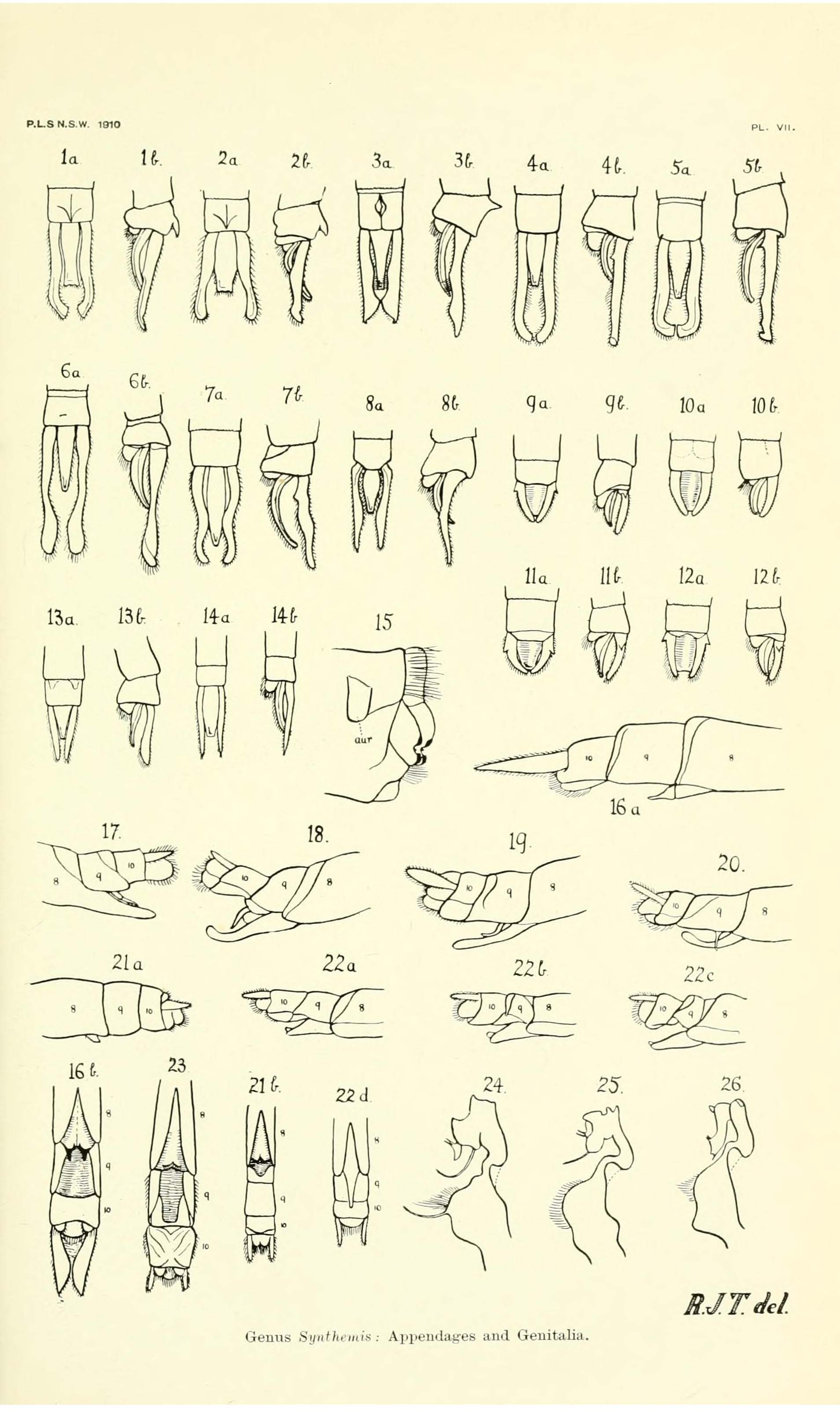
Appendages a dorsal, b profile, 1.Synthemis eustalacta male, 2.Synthemis tasmanica male, 4.Synthemis macrostigma male

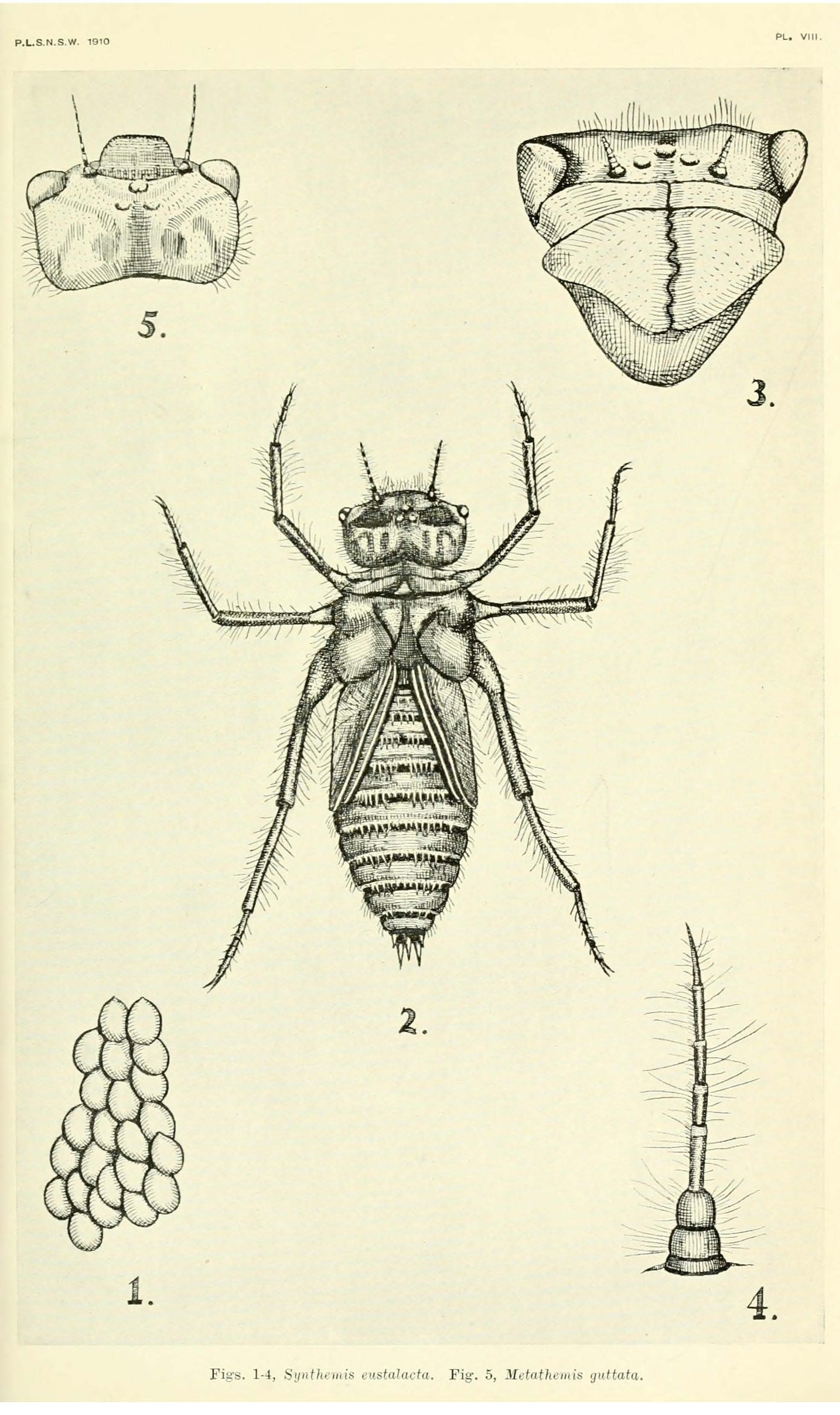
Larvae 1-4.Synthemis eustalacta

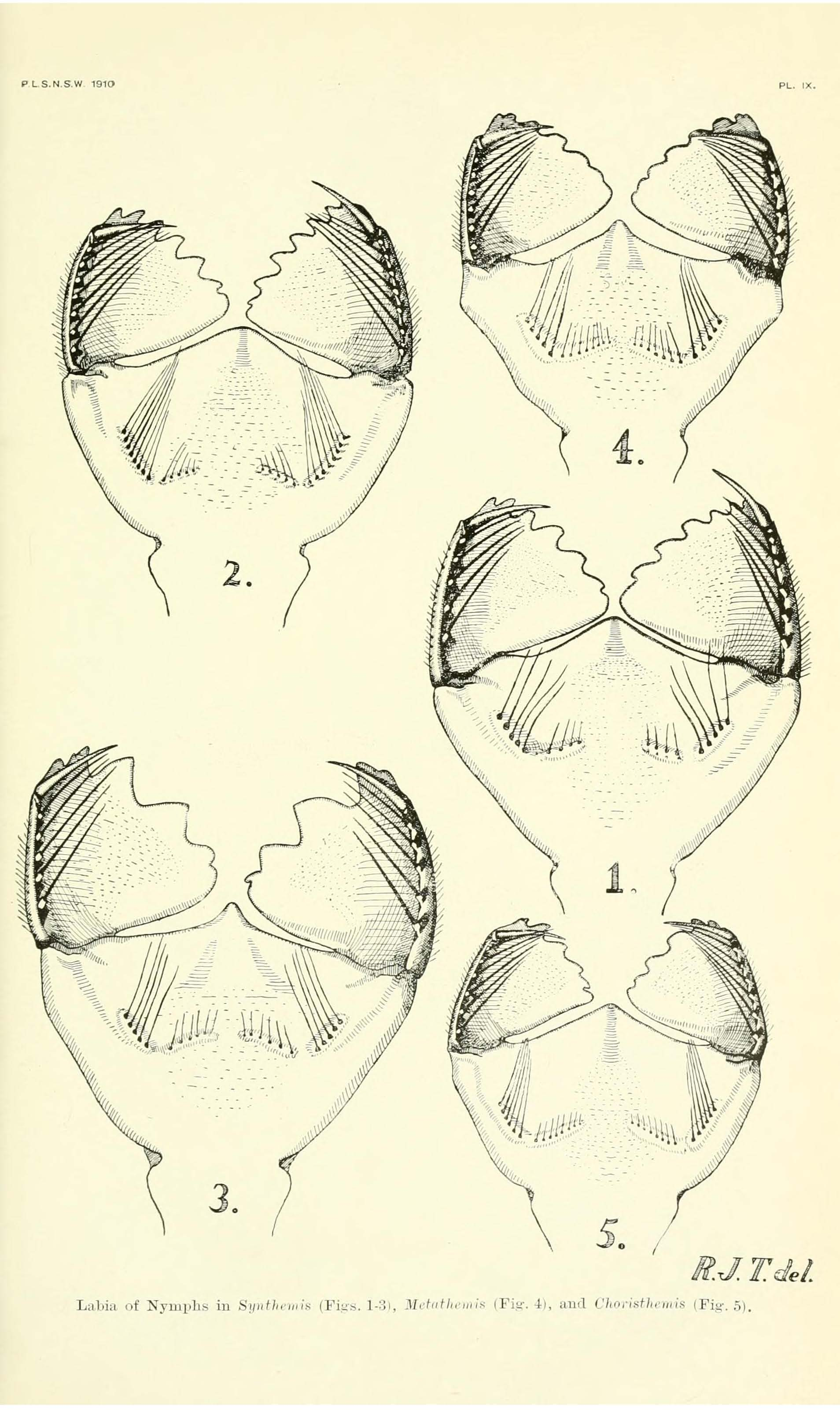
Labia of nymphs
