= Renal lobe =

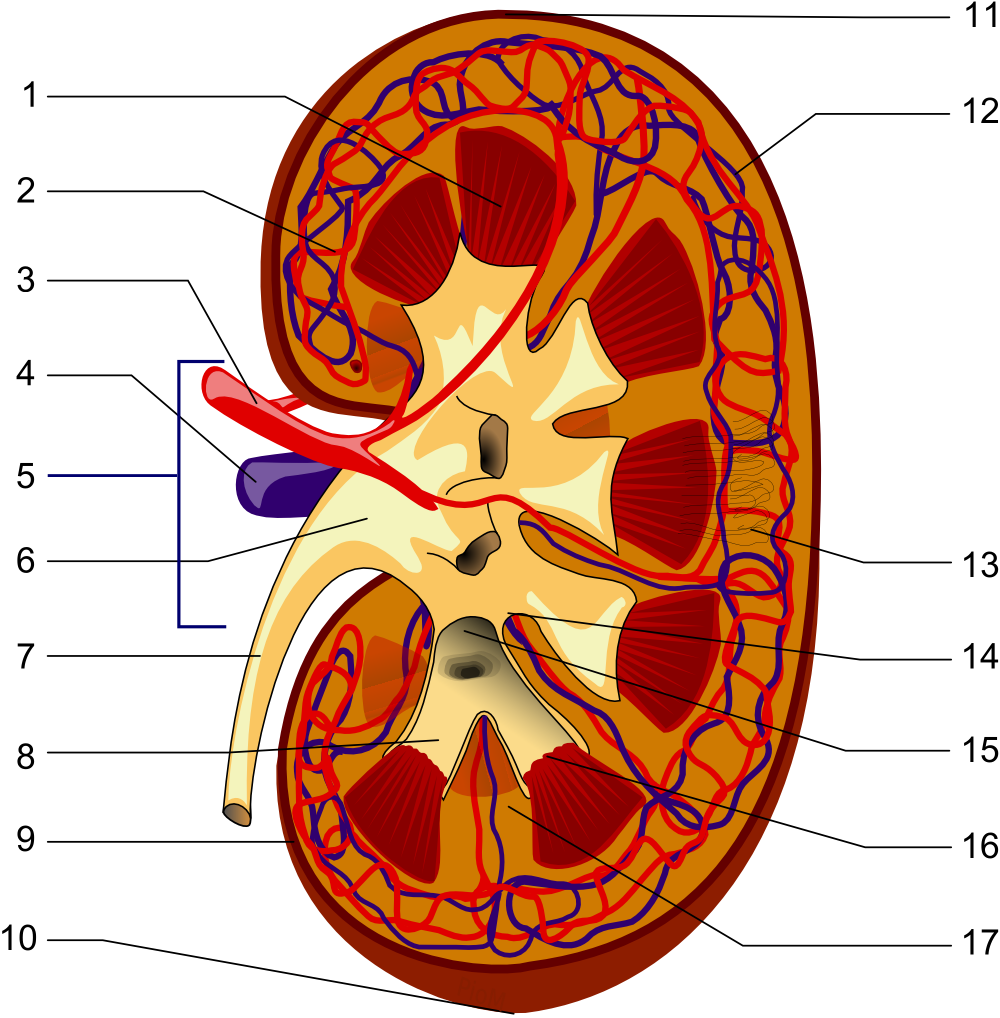
- Renal lobe (not labeled) consists of a pyramid (item #1) and cortex immediately above it.: 1. Renal pyramid; 2. Interlobular artery; 3. Renal artery; 4. Renal vein; 5. Renal hilum; 6. Renal pelvis; 7. Ureter; 8. Minor calyx; 9. Renal capsule; 10. Inferior renal capsule; 11. Superior renal capsule; 12. Interlobar vein; 13. Nephron; 14. Renal sinus; 15. Major calyx; 16. Renal papilla; 17. Renal column

Details
- System: Urinary system
- Artery: Interlobar arteries
- Vein: Interlobar veins

Identifiers
- Latin: Lobi renales

The renal lobe is a portion of a kidney consisting of a renal pyramid and the renal cortex above it. In humans, on average there are 14 renal lobes.

It is visible without a microscope, though it is easier to see in humans than in other animals.

== Renal lobule ==
Each renal lobe is composed of many renal lobules (also known as cortical lobules), which are not visible without a microscope. A renal lobule consists of the nephrons grouped around a single medullary ray, and draining into a single collecting duct.

== See also ==
- Renal capsule
- Renal medulla
