= Arcuate vessels of uterus =

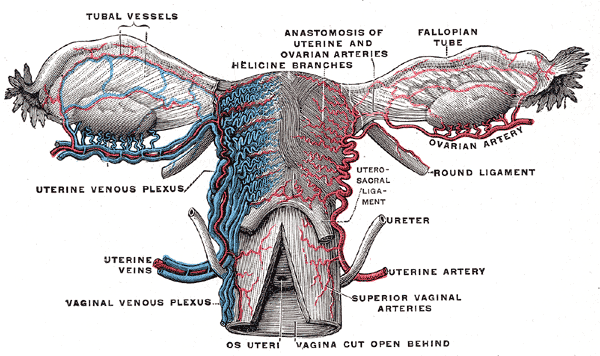
- Vessels of the uterus and its appendages, rear view. Helicine branches (an older name for arcuate vessels) are labeled at center top - they appear to course on the surface of the uterus in this picture, but in fact they course within the myometrium.

- Uterine arterial vasculature, showing arcuate arteries at left.

Details
- Source: Uterine artery

Identifiers
- Latin: rami helicini uterinae
- TA98: A12.2.15.030F
- TA2: 4331
- FMA: 75579

The arcuate vessels of the uterus are a component of the blood supply of the uterus. They are arteries and veins that branch from the uterine arteries and veins, respectively, with additional anastomoses from the ovarian arteries and veins, and penetrate and assume a circumferential course in the myometrium.

They have also been called helicine branches of the uterus (or helicine arterioles), as they are spiral-shaped, but they should not be confused with the spiral arteries that penetrate the endometrium in the inner uterus.

The radial arteries branch off from the arcuate artery through the myometrium.
