= Ototoxic medication =

Drug toxic to the ear

Ototoxic medications are drugs or pharmaceutical agents which induce ototoxicity. Ototoxicity is defined as the toxic effect on the functioning of the inner ear, which may lead to temporary or permanent hearing loss (cochleotoxic) and balance problems (vestibulotoxic).

Anatomy of the human ear

There are a wide range of ototoxic medications, including antibiotics, antimalarials, chemotherapeutic agents, non-steroidal anti-inflammatory drugs (NSAIDs) and loop diuretics. While these drugs target different body systems, they also may cause ototoxicity through different mechanisms, such as damage to the cellular tissues of inner ear structures and disturbances of the auditory nervous system.

Onset of ototoxicity ranges from taking a single dose to long-term usage of the drugs. Signs and symptoms of ototoxicity include tinnitus, hearing loss, dizziness and nausea and/or vomiting. The diagnosis of medicine-induced ototoxicity is challenging as it usually shows only mild symptoms in early stages. Thus, prospective ototoxicity monitoring would be required when patients are using ototoxic medications. Damage may be permanent or may resolve upon discontinuation of the medication.

== Drugs ==
Alcohol is one of the leading substances known to have ototoxic effects. A 2023 systematic review and meta-analysis found that alcohol consumption is associated with an increased risk of hearing loss.

== Antibiotics and chemotherapeutic agents ==
The most common classes of ototoxic medications include antibiotics (including aminoglycosides and glycopeptides) and chemotherapeutic agents. Aminoglycosides and some chemotherapeutic agents are associated with both cochleotoxicity and vestibulotoxicity. They are thought to damage the hair cells of the cochlea. Long-term exposure to these drugs may cause damage that progresses to the upper turn of the cochlea, impairing hearing or even causing deafness. Glycopeptides, on the other hand, are rarely associated with ototoxicity.

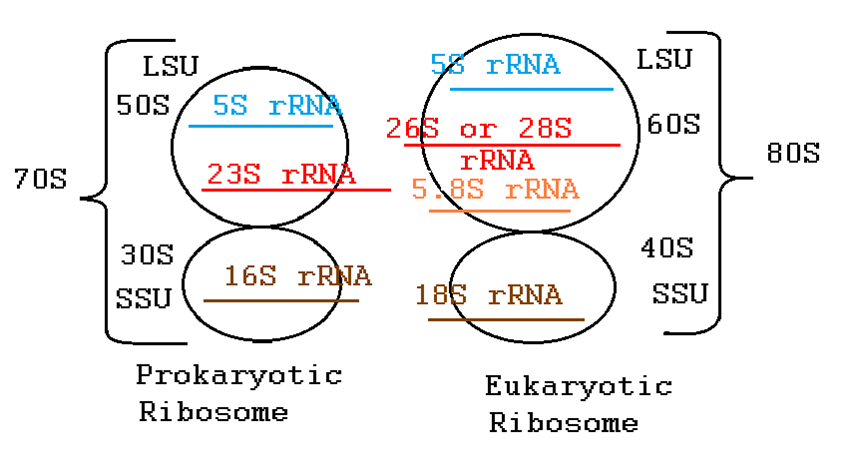
Structures of ribosomes in prokaryotes and eukaryotes; Aminoglycosides binds to the 30S subunit at the bottom part of prokaryotic ribosomes

=== Aminoglycosides ===
Aminoglycosides are a class of antibiotics. The most frequently used aminoglycosides include gentamicin, amikacin and streptomycin. These antibiotics are usually used in combination with other antimicrobial agents to treat drug-resistant organisms. For example, they are used with β-lactam for bacterial infections in pneumonia. They are usually given either intravenously or intramuscularly due to their poor oral absorption.

Aminoglycosides irreversibly inhibit protein synthesis of bacteria, which specifically helps kill the gram-negative bacteria. The drug is first transported into the bacterial cell and it binds to the 30S ribosomal subunit. This action interferes with the reading of codons during mRNA translation, causing misreading and premature termination of the process. This inhibits protein synthesis and ultimately leads to the death of bacterial cells.

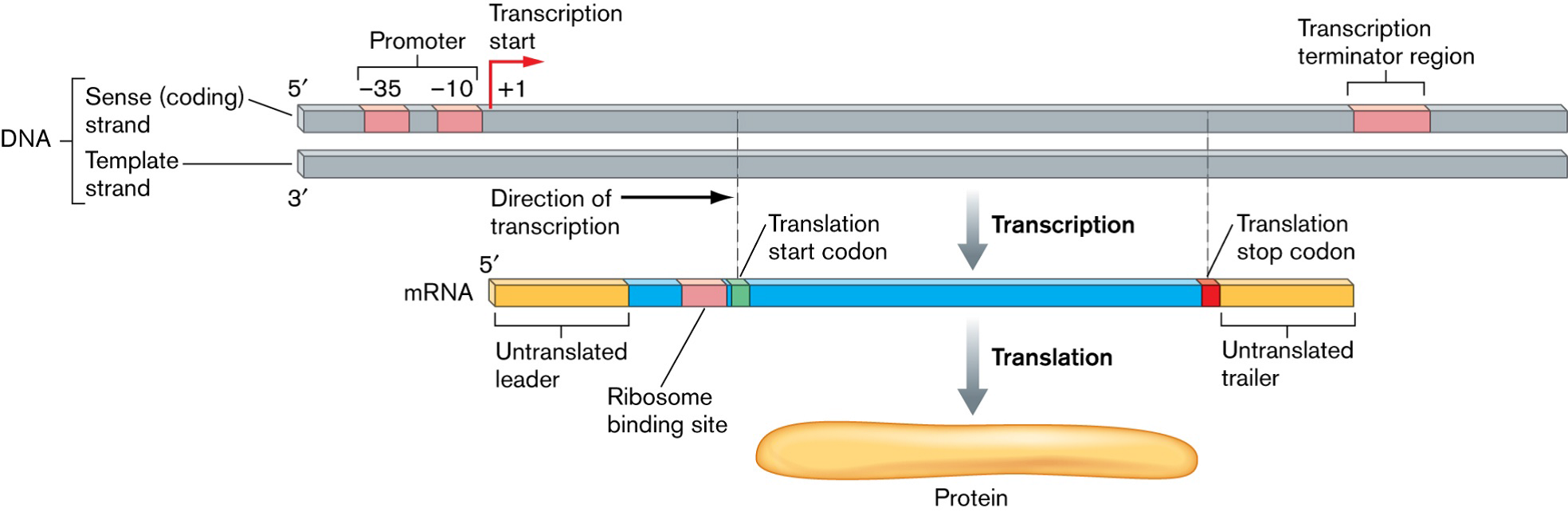
Events during protein synthesis

All aminoglycosides can cause either reversible or irreversible ototoxicity. Ototoxicity is more frequently observed in individuals who received the treatment for more than five days and those who have renal insufficiency. The mechanism of aminoglycosides-induced ototoxicity is not well understood. It is thought that because cochlear cells are rich in mitochondria, these antibiotics may also target cochlear cells and cause their death. Another hypothesis suggests that these drugs lead to the production of reactive oxygen species which generate oxidative stress and damage the inner ear.

=== Glycopeptides ===
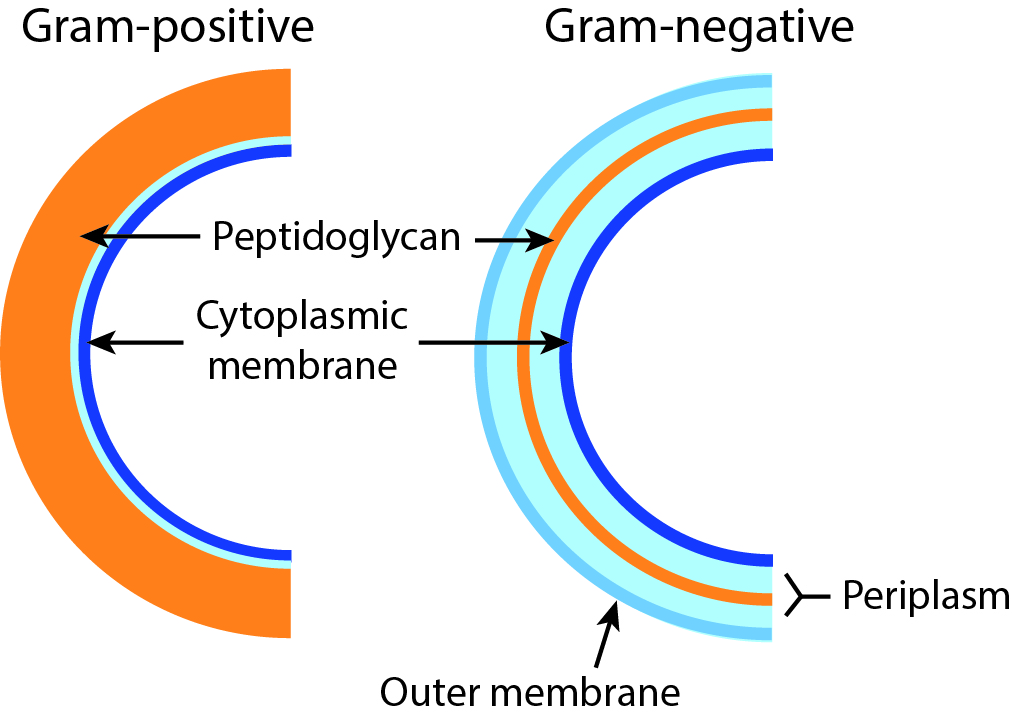
Cell wall components of gram-positive and gram-negative bacteria

Glycopeptides are another class of antibiotics. Vancomycin is the class originator for the glycopeptides. Lipoglycopeptides are a subclass of glycopeptides and they are derived from the structure of vancomycin. Examples are telavancin and dalbavancin.

Vancomycin and the lipoglycopeptides have slight differences in their mechanism of actions. Vancomycin inhibits cell wall synthesis of bacteria by preventing the cell wall component of bacteria, peptidoglycan, from elongating and cross-linking. With weakened peptidoglycan, the bacterial cell becomes susceptible to lysis. Lipoglycopeptides, additionally, can increase the membrane permeability of the bacterial cell and disrupt the bacterial cell membrane potential.

This class of antibiotics can be used to treat skin or joint infections, where gram-positive bacteria are the pathogens responsible. Vancomycin is also used as an initial empirical treatment agent of community-acquired bacterial meningitis in locations where penicillin-resistant S. pneumoniae is common. This drug has other clinical uses, including endocarditis and respiratory tract infections caused by Methicillin-resistant Staphylococcus aureus (MRSA).

Case reports suggested that long-term use of vancomycin has been associated with ototoxicity. However, there is no well-established causal link between vancomycin and ototoxicity. For instance, preclinical studies showed that vancomycin had a low risk of inducing ototoxicity. Despite these findings, literature generally agreed that pre-existing hearing abnormalities, concomitant use of aminoglycosides and renal dysfunction are risk factors for vancomycin-induced ototoxicity.

=== Chemotherapeutic agents ===
Chemotherapeutic agents are drugs that are used in chemotherapy for the treatment of cancer. Many of these agents are known to have the potential to cause hearing loss. Such agents include cisplatin and bleomycin.

==== Cisplatin ====
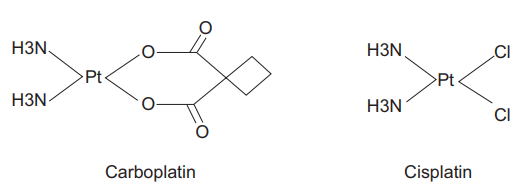
Chemical structures of carboplatin and cisplatin

Cisplatin is known as a platinum coordination complex. Carboplatin and oxaliplatin also belong to platinum coordination complexes, but they are less commonly associated with ototoxicity. These agents are used in the treatment of ovarian, head and neck, bladder, lung and colon cancers. Cisplatin and other platinum coordination complexes work by reacting with various sites on DNA in mainly cancer cells in order to form cross-links. The formed DNA-platinum complexes inhibit replication and transcription, leading to miscoding and cell death.

The mechanism of cisplatin in inducing ototoxicity is believed to involve the accumulation of reactive oxygen species, which exert cytotoxic effect on cochlear cells. Some pharmacogenetics research have opened up new perspectives on the contributing factors of cisplatin-induced ototoxicity. They investigated several cancer-inducing genes and genetic polymorphisms. Results showed that some genes are associated with protective effect on ototoxicity, while others may show no effect or even increased effect on ototoxicity.

==== Bleomycin ====
Bleomycin is one of the antitumour antibiotics and is a fermentation product of Streptomyces verticillus. It has a unique mechanism of action, making it an important agent in treating Hodgkin disease and testicular cancer. This unique chemotherapeutic agent causes oxidative damage to the nucleotides and leads to single- and double-stranded breaks in DNA. Excess breaks in DNA eventually causes cell death. Few case reports have identified the development of ototoxicity in some elderly patients who were administered with bleomycin. Since such cases are rare, the mechanisms behind have yet to be discovered.

== Other examples of ototoxic medications ==
=== Non-steroidal anti-inflammatory drugs ===
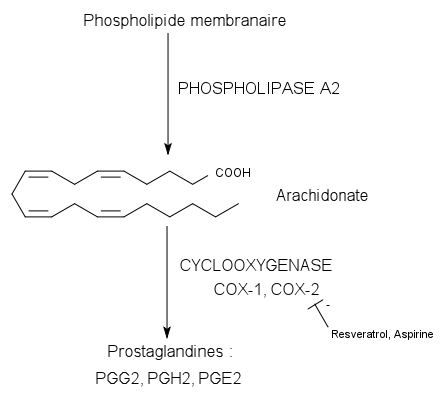
A simplified mechanism of action of COX inhibitors

Non-steroidal anti-inflammatory drugs (NSAIDs) are one of the most recurrently used classes of drug clinically, indicated for anti-inflammatory, analgesic and antipyretic effects. Examples include high-dose aspirin, ibuprofen and naproxen. Its therapeutic effect is achieved by inhibiting the activity of cyclooxygenase (COX), an enzyme mediating the biosynthesis of prostaglandins (PGs) and thromboxanes (TXAs). As this enzyme is inhibited, prostaglandin and thromboxane production is reduced, hence inhibiting the inflammatory response of pain and swelling caused by prostaglandin.

Studies have proven that high-dose usage of aspirin can be associated with ototoxicity, manifesting reversible hearing loss and tinnitus. The underlying mechanism is associated with a change in isolated cochlear outer hair cells (OHCs). Due to the COX inhibition, there is an increasing amount of leukotrienes in the inner ear. This leukotriene elevation leads to an alteration in the shape of isolated OHCs, thus disrupting their functions. Cochlear blood flow is eventually reduced, causing hearing impairment.

=== Phosphodiesterase-5 inhibitors ===
Phosphodiesterase-5 (PDE-5) inhibitors are the first-line drugs indicated for erectile dysfunction (ED), implying the sustained impairment of erectile functioning, which may lead to unsatisfactory sexual performance. Specific PDE-5 inhibitors are also approved for the treatment of benign prostatic hyperplasia, pulmonary hypertension and lower urinary tract symptoms. Common drug examples include sildenafil, vardenafil and tadalafil. The enzyme PDE-5, found in the corpus cavernosum smooth muscle, is responsible for degrading cyclic guanosine monophosphate (cGMP) to 5-GMP. Inhibitors of this enzyme compete with cGMP for binding sites, which in turn increases the level of cGMP in smooth muscles. Through this mechanism, penis erection in male is eventually prolonged, resulting in a correction of ED. These drugs are known to cause headache, flushing and abnormal vision as their adverse effects.

PDE-5 inhibitors are also known for inducing sudden sensorineural hearing loss. It is mainly related to the obstruction and dysfunction of eustachian tubes which affects middle-ear pressure. Due to the high similarity in structure between the penile corpus cavernosum and nasal erectile tissue, PDE-5 inhibitors targeting on corpus cavernosum smooth muscle will also act on nasal erectile tissues, which are mainly located at the inferior turbinate, the middle turbinate and nasal septum. Hence, specific nasal areas may become congested. This mediates inflammatory responses in the eustachian tube which connects to the middle ear, causing an impact on middle ear pressure. Such events will eventually lead to sudden hearing loss.

=== Antimalarials ===
Chemical structure of quinine

Antimalarial drugs can be classified into several classes based on different mechanisms of action and effects, including quinoline-type drugs, naphthoquinone, antifolates, guanidine derived drugs, sesquiterpene lactones, etc. In particular, quinoline-type drugs are known to be ototoxic. Examples include chloroquine and hydroxychloroquine which are quinine-like. Apart from antimalarial effects, these drugs are also used in the treatment of other diseases such as dermatological, immunological, rheumatological, and severe infectious diseases.

Various ototoxic effects are manifested by using antimalarial drugs, with dizziness being one of the most common one. Other effects include vestibular symptoms, hearing loss and tinnitus, which can appear to be both temporary or permanent. Nonetheless, the underlying mechanisms of antimalarial-induced ototoxicity are still poorly understood. Studies have suggested that high doses of quinine have an impact on the central auditory pathway and auditory periphery, which leads to elongation and subsequent contraction of isolated OHCs in the cochlea. This structural alteration affects their functions and results in cochlear blood flow reduction.

=== Loop diuretics ===
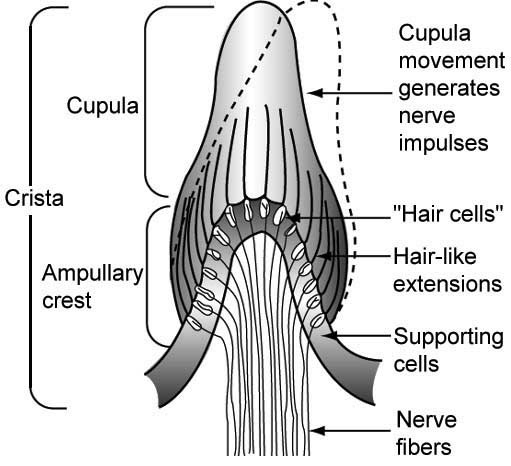
The vestibular system in the inner ear

Loop diuretics is a major class of diuretic drugs indicated for oedema due to heart failure, liver disease and kidney disease. It is also used for treating hypertension. Common examples include furosemide, bumetanide and ethacrynic acid. Loop diuretics act on the thick ascending limb of the loop of Henle in the kidney nephrons. The major mechanism of ion reabsorption in the thick ascending limb is the active transport of ions through Na^{+}-K^{+}-2Cl^{−} co-transporters (NKCCs). By binding to and inhibiting NKCCs at the apical membrane of the loop of Henle, the reabsorption of Na+, K+ and Cl- is impaired, contributing to a higher ion concentration in the lumen. Hence, the ultimate effect of loop diuretics is a reduction in salt reabsorption and an increase in water excretion.

Loop diuretics-induced ototoxicity is suggested to be associated with their action on stria vascularis located on the lateral wall of the cochlea. This area is responsible for maintaining the balance of ions of endolymph. A high potassium concentration as well as a low sodium concentration should be maintained in the endolymph to allow cochlear hair cells to function normally. As the inhibitory actions of loop diuretics will also target on NKCCs existing on membrane surfaces of stria vascularis marginal cells, there will be a disturbance on the ionic composition of endolymph. Once the endocochlear potential cannot be maintained, hearing is temporarily impaired. It is noticed that the risk of ototoxicity caused by furosemide is much higher than that of bumetanide.

== Monitoring and management of ototoxicity ==
Several approaches can be considered in managing patients who developed ototoxicity as an adverse reaction to the medications. One approach to managing ototoxicity is the use of otoprotective agents. An example is sodium thiosulfate, which the US FDA approved in 2022 to minimise the risk of ototoxicity and hearing loss in newborn, child, and adolescent cancer patients receiving cisplatin. Other agents being investigated for their potential to reduce ototoxicity include D-methionine and L-N-acetylcysteine. The use of D-methionine to protect against hearing loss induced by drugs like cisplatin and aminoglycosides is preliminarily supported by animal studies. NMDA antagonists are also shown to limit aminoglycoside-induced ototoxicity.

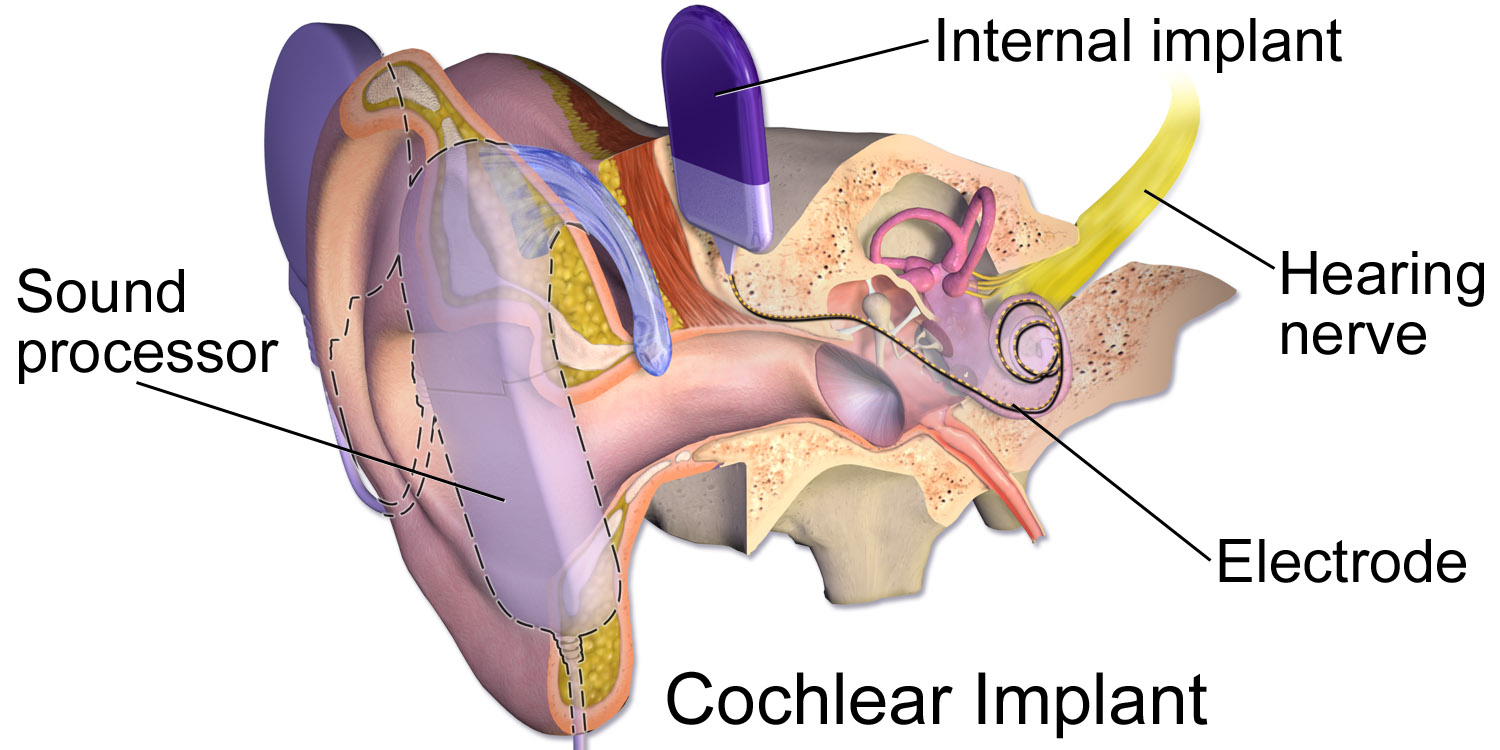
Illustration of a cochlear implant

Restorative care, which aims to regenerate hair cells that are damaged by ototoxic drugs, can also be considered. For example, the infusion of neurotrophic factors (neurotrophin-3) was shown to produce otoprotective effects. This protective agent was also found to be associated with the survival of cochlear spiral ganglion neurons after hearing loss or deafness.

Audiological management can be implemented, for example, by providing hearing aids. In more seriously affected patients, cochlear implantation may be considered and discussed with the patient. It is also important for the healthcare team to educate affected patients and their family members on communication skills in order to minimize the impact on patients' daily life.

== See also ==
- Auditory system
- Ototoxicity
- Neurotoxicity
