= Diuretic =

Substance that promotes the production of urine

Diuretics
- Drug class
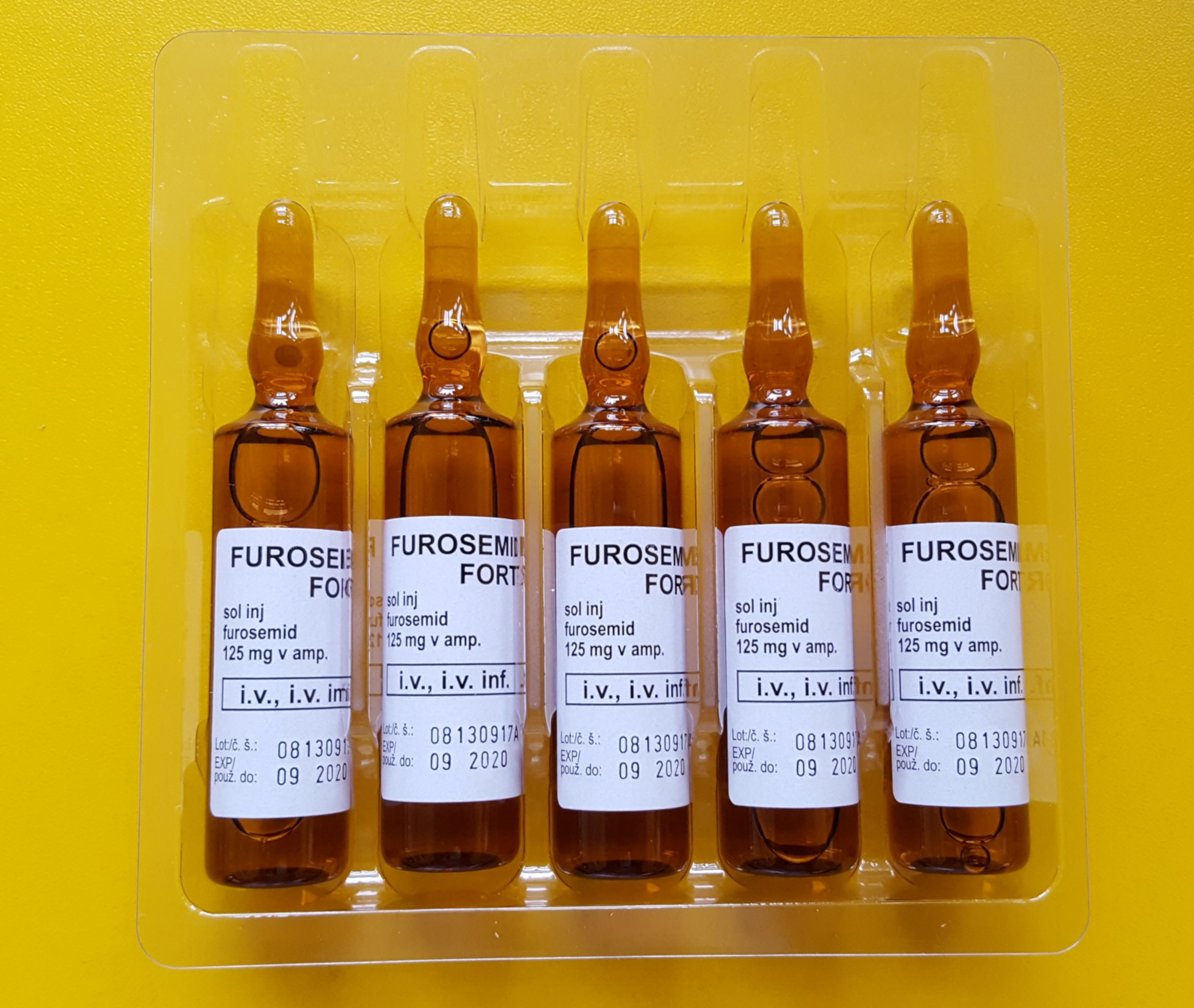
- Furosemide 125 mg vials for intravenous application

Class identifiers
- Use: Forced diuresis, hypertension
- ATC code: C03

External links
- MeSH: D004232

Legal status

A diuretic (/ˌdaɪjʊˈrɛtɪk/) is any substance that promotes diuresis, the increased production of urine. This includes forced diuresis. A diuretic tablet is sometimes colloquially called a water tablet. There are several categories of diuretics. All diuretics increase the excretion of water from the body, through the kidneys. There exist several classes of diuretic, and each works in a distinct way. Alternatively, an antidiuretic, such as vasopressin (antidiuretic hormone), is an agent or drug which reduces the excretion of water in urine.

== Medical uses ==
In medicine, diuretics are used to treat heart failure, liver cirrhosis, hypertension, influenza, water poisoning, and certain kidney diseases. Some diuretics, such as acetazolamide, help to make the urine more alkaline, and are helpful in increasing excretion of substances such as aspirin in cases of overdose or poisoning. Diuretics are sometimes abused by athletes who seek to excrete water for quick weight loss and/or to mask their use of banned substances, and by people with eating disorders, especially people with bulimia nervosa, who seek to lose weight.

The antihypertensive actions of some diuretics (thiazides and loop diuretics in particular) are independent of their diuretic effect. That is, the reduction in blood pressure is not due to decreased blood volume resulting from increased urine production, but occurs through other mechanisms and at lower doses than that required to produce diuresis. Indapamide was specifically designed with this in mind, and has a larger therapeutic window for hypertension (without pronounced diuresis) than most other diuretics.

== Types ==
=== High-ceiling/loop diuretics ===
High-ceiling diuretics may cause a substantial diuresis – up to 20% of the filtered load of NaCl (salt) and water. This is large in comparison to normal renal sodium reabsorption which leaves only about 0.4% of filtered sodium in the urine. Loop diuretics have this ability, and are therefore often synonymous with high-ceiling diuretics. Loop diuretics, such as furosemide, inhibit the body's ability to reabsorb sodium at the ascending loop in the nephron, which leads to an excretion of water in the urine, whereas water normally follows sodium back into the extracellular fluid. Other examples of high-ceiling loop diuretics include ethacrynic acid and torasemide.

=== Thiazides ===
Thiazide-type diuretics such as hydrochlorothiazide act on the distal convoluted tubule and inhibit the sodium-chloride symporter leading to a retention of water in the urine, as water normally follows penetrating solutes. Frequent urination is due to the increased loss of water that has not been retained from the body as a result of a concomitant relationship with sodium loss from the convoluted tubule. The short-term anti-hypertensive action is based on the fact that thiazides decrease preload, decreasing blood pressure. On the other hand, the long-term effect is due to an unknown vasodilator effect that decreases blood pressure by decreasing resistance.

=== Carbonic anhydrase inhibitors ===
Carbonic anhydrase inhibitors inhibit the enzyme carbonic anhydrase which is found in the proximal convoluted tubule. This results in several effects including bicarbonate accumulation in the urine and decreased sodium absorption. Drugs in this class include acetazolamide and methazolamide.

=== Potassium-sparing diuretics ===
Potassium-sparing diuretics do not promote the secretion of potassium into the urine; thus, potassium is retained and not lost as much as with other diuretics. The term "potassium-sparing" refers to an effect rather than a mechanism or location; nonetheless, the term almost always refers to two specific classes that have their effect at similar locations:

- Aldosterone antagonists: spironolactone, which is a competitive antagonist of aldosterone. Aldosterone normally adds sodium channels in the principal cells of the collecting duct and late distal tubule of the nephron. Spironolactone prevents aldosterone from entering the principal cells, preventing sodium reabsorption. Similar agents are eplerenone and potassium canreonate.
- Epithelial sodium channel blockers: amiloride and triamterene.

=== Calcium-sparing diuretics ===
The term "calcium-sparing diuretic" is sometimes used to identify agents that result in a relatively low rate of excretion of calcium.

The reduced concentration of calcium in the urine can lead to an increased rate of calcium in serum. The sparing effect on calcium can be beneficial in hypocalcemia, or unwanted in hypercalcemia.

The thiazides and potassium-sparing diuretics are considered to be calcium-sparing diuretics.

- The thiazides cause a net decrease in calcium lost in urine.
- The potassium-sparing diuretics cause a net increase in calcium lost in urine, but the increase is much smaller than the increase associated with other diuretic classes.

By contrast, loop diuretics promote a significant increase in calcium excretion. This can increase risk of reduced bone density.

=== Osmotic diuretics ===
Osmotic diuretics (e. g., mannitol) are substances that increase osmolarity, but have limited tubular epithelial cell permeability. They work primarily by expanding extracellular fluid and plasma volume, therefore increasing blood flow to the kidney, particularly the peritubular capillaries. This reduces medullary osmolality and thus impairs the concentration of urine in the loop of Henle (which usually uses the high osmotic and solute gradient to transport solutes and water). Further, the limited tubular epithelial cell permeability increases osmolality and thus water retention in the filtrate.

It was previously believed that the primary mechanism of osmotic diuretics such as mannitol is that they are filtered in the glomerulus, but cannot be reabsorbed. Thus their presence leads to an increase in the osmolarity of the filtrate and to maintain osmotic balance, water is retained in the urine.

Glucose, like mannitol, is a sugar that can behave as an osmotic diuretic. Unlike mannitol, glucose is commonly found in the blood. However, in certain conditions, such as diabetes mellitus, the concentration of glucose in the blood (hyperglycemia) exceeds the maximum reabsorption capacity of the kidney. When this happens, glucose remains in the filtrate, leading to the osmotic retention of water in the urine. Glucosuria causes a loss of hypotonic water and Na^{+}, leading to a hypertonic state with signs of volume depletion, such as dry mucosa, hypotension, tachycardia, and decreased turgor of the skin. Use of some drugs, especially stimulants, may also increase blood glucose and thus increase urination..

=== Low-ceiling diuretics ===
The term "low-ceiling diuretic" is used to indicate a diuretic has a rapidly flattening dose effect curve (in contrast to "high-ceiling", where the relationship is close to linear). Certain classes of diuretic are in this category, such as the thiazides.

== Mechanism of action ==
Diuretics are tools of considerable therapeutic importance. First, they effectively reduce blood pressure. Loop and thiazide diuretics are secreted from the proximal tubule via the organic anion transporter-1 and exert their diuretic action by binding to the Na(+)-K(+)-2Cl(-) co-transporter type 2 in the thick ascending limb and the Na(+)-Cl(-) co-transporter in the distal convoluted tubule, respectively.

Classification of common diuretics and their mechanisms of action.
Class	Examples	Mechanism	Location (numbered in distance along nephron)
Ethanol	drinking alcohol	Inhibits vasopressin secretion	
Water		Inhibits vasopressin secretion	
Acidifying salts	calcium chloride, ammonium chloride		1.
Arginine vasopressin receptor 2 antagonists	amphotericin B, lithium	Inhibits vasopressin's action	5. collecting duct
Selective vasopressin V2 antagonist (sometimes called aquaretics)	tolvaptan, conivaptan	Competitive vasopressin antagonism leads to decreased number of aquaporin channels in the apical membrane of the renal collecting ducts in kidneys, causing decreased water reabsorption. This causes an increase in renal free water excretion (aquaresis), an increase in serum sodium concentration, a decrease in urine osmolality, and an increase in urine output.	5. collecting duct
Na-H exchanger antagonists	dopamine	Promotes Na^{+} excretion	2. proximal tubule
Carbonic anhydrase inhibitors	acetazolamide, dorzolamide	Inhibits H^{+} secretion, resultant promotion of Na^{+} and K^{+} excretion	2. proximal tubule
Loop diuretics	bumetanide, ethacrynic acid, furosemide, torsemide	Inhibits the Na-K-2Cl symporter	3. medullary thick ascending limb
Osmotic diuretics	glucose (especially in uncontrolled diabetes), mannitol	Promotes osmotic diuresis	2. proximal tubule, descending limb
Potassium-sparing diuretics	amiloride, spironolactone, eplerenone, triamterene, potassium canrenoate.	Inhibition of Na+/K+ exchanger: Spironolactone inhibits aldosterone action, Amiloride inhibits epithelial sodium channels	5. cortical collecting ducts
Thiazides	bendroflumethiazide, hydrochlorothiazide	Inhibits reabsorption by Na^{+}/Cl^{−} symporter	4. distal convoluted tubules
Xanthines	caffeine, theophylline, theobromine	Inhibits reabsorption of Na^{+}, increase glomerular filtration rate	1. tubules

Caffeine, when initially consumed in large quantities, is both a diuretic and a natriuretic, and it is sometimes marketed as a diuretic, but this effect disappears with frequent consumption.

== Adverse effects ==
The main adverse effects of diuretics are hypovolemia, hypokalemia, hyperkalemia, hyponatremia, metabolic alkalosis, metabolic acidosis, and hyperuricemia.

Adverse effect	Diuretics	Symptoms
hypovolemia	loop diuretics; thiazides	lassitude; thirst; muscle cramps; hypotension
hypokalemia	acetazolamides; loop diuretics; thiazides	muscle weakness; paralysis; arrhythmia
hyperkalemia	amilorides; triamterenes; spironolactone	arrhythmia; muscle cramps; paralysis
hyponatremia	thiazides; furosemides	CNS symptoms; coma
metabolic alkalosis	loop diuretics; thiazides	arrhythmia; CNS symptoms
metabolic acidosis	acetazolamides; amilorides; triamterene	Kussmaul respirations; muscle weakness; neurological symptoms; lethargy; coma; seizures; stupor
hypercalcemia	thiazides	gout; tissue calcification; fatigue; depression; confusion; anorexia; nausea; vomiting; constipation; pancreatitis; increased urination
hyperuricemia	loop diuretics; thiazides	gout

== Abuse in sports ==
A common application of diuretics is for the purposes of invalidating drug tests. Diuretics increase the urine volume and dilute doping agents and their metabolites. Another use is to rapidly lose weight to meet a weight category in sports like boxing and wrestling.

== See also ==
- Antidiuretic
- Laxative
- Diuresis
- Hydration
- Water poisoning
- Dehydration
