= Alcohol (medicine) =

Alcohols used as antiseptics, disinfectants or antidotes

- Ethanol is a commonly used medical alcohol.

Clinical data
- Routes of administration: Topical, intravenous, by mouth
- Drug class: Antiseptics, disinfectants, antidotes
- ATC code: D08AX08 (WHO) V03AB16 (WHO), V03AZ01 (WHO)

Legal status
- Legal status: US: OTC

Pharmacokinetic data
- Metabolism: Liver

Identifiers
- CAS Number: 64-17-5
- PubChem CID: 702
- DrugBank: DB00898
- ChemSpider: 682
- UNII: 3K9958V90M

Alcohols, in various forms, are used medically as an antiseptic, disinfectant, and antidote. Alcohols applied to the skin are used to disinfect skin before an injection and before surgery. They may also be used as a hand sanitizer; to clean other areas; and in mouthwashes. Taken by mouth or injected into a vein, ethanol is used to treat methanol or ethylene glycol toxicity when fomepizole is not available.

Side effects of alcohols applied to the skin include skin irritation. Care should be taken with electrocautery, as ethanol is flammable. Types of alcohol used include ethanol, denatured ethanol, 1-propanol, and isopropyl alcohol. Alcohols are effective against a range of microorganisms, though they do not inactivate spores. Concentrations of 60% to 90% work best.

== Uses ==
95% ABV ethanol is known as spiritus fortis in medical context.

=== Alcohol septal ablation ===
Ablysinol (a brand of 99% ethanol medical alcohol) was sold from $1,300 to $10,000 per 10-pack in 2020 due to FDA administrator action granting exclusivity when used for treating hypertrophic obstructive cardiomyopathy with alcohol septal ablation in the US through 2025, despite "misuse" of the orphan drug act.

=== Antiseptics ===
==== Alcohols ====
Ethanol is listed under Antiseptics, and Alcohol based hand rub under Disinfectants, on the World Health Organization's List of Essential Medicines.

Applied to the skin, alcohols are used to disinfect skin before a injection and before surgery. They may be used both to disinfect the skin of the person and the hands of the healthcare providers. They can also be used to clean other areas, and in mouthwashes.

Both ethanol and isopropyl alcohol are common ingredients in topical antiseptics, including hand sanitizer.

===== Risks =====
Research indicates that alcohol used as pre-surgical antiseptic preparations for ear procedures may have some ototoxic properties. In this regard, these alcohol preparations may be considered potential ototoxic medication.

=== Antidote ===
When taken by mouth or injected into a vein ethanol is used to treat methanol or ethylene glycol toxicity when fomepizole is not available.

==== Mechanism ====
Ethanol, when used for toxicity, competes with other alcohols for the alcohol dehydrogenase enzyme, lessening metabolism into toxic aldehyde and carboxylic acid derivatives, and reducing more serious toxic effect of the glycols to crystallize in the kidneys.

=== Euthanasia ===
Alcohol can intensify the sedation caused by hypnotics/sedatives such as barbiturates, benzodiazepines, sedative antihistamines, opioids, nonbenzodiazepines/Z-drugs (such as zolpidem and zopiclone).

In the Netherlands, pentobarbital is part of the standard protocol for physician-assisted suicide for self-administration by the patient. It is given in liquid form, in a solution of sugar syrup and alcohol, containing 9 grams of pentobarbital. This is preceded by an antiemetic to prevent vomiting.

=== Medicinal solvent ===
Ethanol, often in high concentrations, is used to dissolve many water-insoluble medications and related compounds. Liquid preparations of pain medications, cough and cold medicines, and mouth washes, for example, may contain up to 25% ethanol and may need to be avoided in individuals with adverse reactions to ethanol such as alcohol-induced respiratory reactions. Ethanol is present mainly as an antimicrobial preservative in over 700 liquid preparations of medicine including acetaminophen, iron supplements, ranitidine, furosemide, mannitol, phenobarbital, trimethoprim/sulfamethoxazole and over-the-counter cough medicine.

Some medicinal solutions of ethanol are also known as tinctures.

=== Mouthwash ===
Usually mouthwashes are antiseptic solutions intended to reduce the microbial load in the mouth, although other mouthwashes might be given for other reasons such as for their analgesic, anti-inflammatory or anti-fungal action. Also, alcohol is added to mouthwash not to destroy bacteria but to act as a carrier agent for essential active ingredients such as menthol, eucalyptol and thymol, which help to penetrate plaque.

A 2020 systematic review and meta-analysis concluded that there is no definitive link between alcohol-based mouthwash use and the risk of oral cancer. This should not be confused with the fact that alcohol consumption at any quantity is a risk factor for alcohol and cancer such as cancers of the mouth, esophagus, pharynx and larynx.

=== Sclerosant ===
Absolute ethanol is used as a sclerosant in sclerotherapy. Sclerotherapy has been used "in the treatment of simple pleural effusions, vascular malformations, lymphocytes and seromas."

=== Sedative ===
Ethchlorvynol, developed in the 1950s, was used to treat insomnia, but prescriptions for the drug had fallen significantly by 1990, as other hypnotics that were considered safer (i.e., less dangerous in overdose) became much more common. Also, ethchlorvynol is not compatible with intravenous injection like ethanol—serious injury (including the loss of limbs due to vascular injury) or death can occur when it is used in this manner. It is no longer prescribed in the United States due to unavailability, but it is still available in some countries and would still be considered legal to possess and use with a valid prescription.

== Society and culture ==
=== Unproven methods against COVID-19 ===
==== Unproven COVID-19 prevention from alcohol consumption ====
Drinking alcohol will not prevent or cure COVID-19, contrary to some claims.

==== Unproven COVID-19 hand sanitizer ====
Vodka was alleged to be an effective homemade hand sanitizer, or an ingredient in one. The company whose brand was alleged to be protective responded to the rumours by citing the US Centers for Disease Control and Prevention statement that hand sanitizers needed to be at least 60% alcohol to be effective, and stating that their product was only 40% alcohol.

== History ==
=== Ancient world ===
Since antiquity, prior to the development of modern agents, alcohol was used as a general anesthetic.

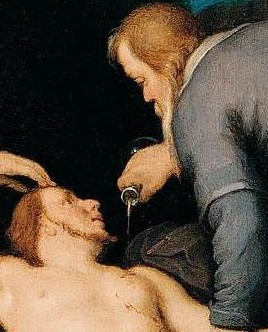
Detail from The Good Samaritan by Cornelis van Haarlem (1627) showing the Samaritan pouring oil and wine on the injured man's wounds

In the history of wound care, beer, and wine, are recognized as substances used for healing wounds.

=== Late Middle Ages ===
Alcohol has been used as an antiseptic as early as 1363, with evidence to support its use becoming available in the late 1800s.

At times and places of poor public sanitation (such as medieval Europe), the consumption of alcoholic drinks was a way of avoiding water-borne diseases such as cholera.

=== Modern period ===
Early doctors recognized that ethanol was a risky anesthetic because it could lead to death from alcohol poisoning or vomit inhalation (pulmonary aspiration). This led to use of alternatives in antiquity, such as opium and cannabis, and later diethyl ether starting in the 1840s. As safer options became available, ethanol was eventually phased out as a general anesthetic.

Methylpentynol, discovered 1913, prescribed for the treatment of insomnia, but its use was quickly phased out in response to newer drugs with far more favorable safety profiles. The drug has been replaced by benzodiazepines and is no longer sold anywhere.
