= Dark cell =

Dark cells are specialized nonsensory epithelial cells found on either side of the vestibular organs (the utricle and the ampullae of the semicircular canals) and lining the endolymphatic space. These dark-cell areas in the vestibular organ are structures involved in the production of endolymph, an inner ear fluid, secreting potassium towards the endolymphatic fluid. Dark cells take part in fluid homeostasis to preserve the unique high-potassium and low-sodium content of the endolymph and also maintain the calcium homeostasis of the inner ear.

Morphological and immunohistochemical studies in several species have indicated that these dark cell areas also form a single layer resting on top of pigmented cells at the base of the cristae ampullaris in the semi-circular canals and around the utricular macula.

== Structure ==
Dark cells are morphologically and functionally similar to marginal cells of the stria vascularis as they both display characteristics of fluid transport tissue; however, studies indicate an earlier histological and immunohistological maturity in the dark-cell areas compared to the stria vascularis.

The dark cell epithelium consists of cells with a multitude of pinocytotic vesicles near their luminal surface. A numerable portion of infoldings occurs at the basal end of the dark cell toward the basal membrane. These infoldings contain a high quantity of mitochondria. The nucleus of the dark cell is displaced toward the surface.

== Function ==
Vestibular dark cells transport potassium ions into the inner ear endolymph, a potassium-rich fluid whose homeostasis is essential for hearing and balance. Dark cell regions of the vestibular system are involved in active (energy consuming) ion transport to maintain the unusual endolymph composition. In other words, dark cells utilize the Na^{+}/K^{+}-ATPase pump in order to transport potassium.

The basolateral membranes of vestibular dark cells are highly folded, allowing the enclosure of the numerous large mitochondria, and they contain high levels of Na^{+}/K^{+}-ATPase in both alpha and beta isoforms, transporting potassium into the cell in exchange for sodium while consuming ATP. The infoldings also create large surface area over which ion exchange can take place and the plethora of mitochondria enclosed provides the needed energy source of ATP for active transport.

The basolateral membrane also contains a Na^{+}/K^{+}/Cl^{—}-co-transporter, (NKCC1) which transports all three ions into the cell. The transport of sodium ions into the cell enhances the effect of the Na^{+}/K^{+}-ATPase pump by stimulating the outward transport of Na^{+}, and therefore, the inward transport of K^{+}. Na-K-Cl cotransporter is the therapeutic target of action for loop diuretics in the kidney and loop diuretics have rapid, acute ototoxic side effects through an action on the co-transporter in vestibular dark cells. These acute ototoxic side effects inhibit ion transport resulting in accumulation of ions in the extracellular space leading to edema.

The apical membranes of the dark cells also have a K^{+} channel which is formed of two subunits, the KCNE1 regulatory protein and the KCNQ1 channel proteins.^{[8}] This channel provides the pathway through which K^{+} is secreted into the endolymph. As a result, mutations in the KCNE1 gene disrupt endolymph production in the vestibular system, leading to the collapse of the epithelia of the roof of the utricle, saccule and ampullae, as well as dysfunction of the vestibular sensory organs.

== Research ==
Many species (with recent studies done on dogs) are affected by balance disorders and hearing problems that can be caused by a problem in the dark-cell areas in the vestibular endorgans. Studies researching damaged dark cells due to genetic abnormalities or therapeutics are very important in attempting to understand the onset and mechanism of said balance impairments.

Dogs have been used as models due to similarities between humans and dogs with regards to inner ear size, inner ear lesions and susceptibility to ototoxins.

== See also ==
- List of distinct cell types in the adult human body
