= Co-amilofruse =

Combination of
- Amiloride: Potassium-sparing diuretic
- Furosemide: Loop diuretic

Clinical data
- AHFS/Drugs.com: International Drug Names
- Routes of administration: Oral
- ATC code: C03EB01 (WHO)

Legal status
- Legal status: UK: POM (Prescription only)

Identifiers
- ChemSpider: none

Co-amilofruse (BAN) is a nonproprietary name used to denote a combination of amiloride and furosemide, which are both diuretics. Co-amilofruse is a treatment for fluid retention (oedema), either in the legs (peripheral edema) or on the lungs (pulmonary oedema). Furosemide is a loop diuretic and is more effective than amiloride, but has a tendency to cause low potassium levels (hypokalaemia); the potassium-sparing effects of amiloride may balance this.

== Formulation ==
Two strengths of co-amilofruse are available:

- 2.5 mg amiloride with 20 mg furosemide, BAN of Co-amilofruse 2.5/20 (brand name Frumil LS)
- 5 mg amiloride with 40 mg furosemide, BAN of Co-amilofruse 5/4-0 (brand name Frumil)
