= Osmotic diuretic =

Diuretic that reduces the reabsorption of water and sodium

An osmotic diuretic is a diuretic which is freely filtered at the glomerulus and subsequently undergoes limited reabsorption. Osmotic diuretics are relatively pharmacologically inert substances, and are given intravenously. They increase the osmolarity of blood and renal filtrate. The prototypical osmotic diuretic is mannitol. Other examples include glycerol, urea, and isosorbide.

Osmotic diuretics work chiefly by expanding extracellular fluid and plasma volume, thereby also increasing renal blood flow. This washes out solutes that maintain the cortical medullary gradient in the kidney, resulting in impaired osmotic urine concentrating ability in the loop of Henle. Osmotic diuretics can be used medically to improve GFR in acute kidney failure, and to reduce intracranial pressure and intra-ocular pressure as well as to promote prompt removal of renal toxins.

== Mechanism of action ==
=== Renal ===
In the nephron, osmotic diuretics act at the portions of the nephron that are water-permeable. Any osmotically active agent that is filtered by the glomerulus but not reabsorbed causes water to be retained in these segments, thus promoting water diuresis. The presence of a non-reabsorbable solute prevents normal reabsorption of water by interposing a countervailing osmotic force. The increase in urine flow rate decreases the contact time between tubular fluid and the tubular epithelium, thus reducing sodium and water reabsorption.

Osmotic diuretics act chiefly at the loop of Henle, but also act at proximal tubule, and - in case of presence of arginine-vasopressin (AVP) (anti-diuretic hormone) - the collecting tubules as well (here counteracting AVP-mediated water antidiuresis by osmotic effects).

Osmotic diuretics increase urinary excretion of nearly all electrolytes. Osmotic diuretics promote water diuresis to a greater degree than natriuresis which can result in dehydration and hypernatremia.

==== Loop of Henle ====
By causing extracellular fluid compartment volume (and thereby blood volume), osmotic diuretics increase renal blood flow (though without significantly affecting GFR); increased blood flow through the renal medulla reduces medullary tonicity by washing away NaCl and urea. Reduced medullary tonicity reduces the kidney's urine concentrating ability by reducing osmotic water reabsorption at descending thin limb of loop of Henle so that tubular fluid reaching the ascenting thin limb is abnormally dilute, limiting passive reabsorption of NaCl in the ascenting thin limb.

==== Proximal tubule ====
At the proximal tubule, they act as non-reabsorbable solutes, limiting osmostic movement of water from the lumen to the interstitial space. This lowers luminal Na+ concentration sufficiently to halt Na^{+} reabsorption.

=== Body compartment fluid shifts ===
Osmotic diuretics shift water from the intracellular to the extracellular fluid compartments, thus increasing extracellular fluid volume, decreasing blood viscosity, and inhibiting renin release. This fluid shift can result in hyponaetremia. The expansion of the extracellular fluid volume is transient.

Osmotic diuretics are used for emergency treatment of acute increased intracranial or intraocular pressure. The therapeutic mechanism of osmotic diuretics in these circumstances is unrelated to their diuretic effects per se; rather, because osmotic diuretics increase plasma osmolarity but do not distribute into the brain or eye, water is osmotically drawn out of the brain and eye compartments into the intravascular compartment.

==== Intracranial pressure reduction ====
Mannitol lowers intracranial pressure by two mechanisms. A osmotic gradient across the blood-brain barrier causes movement of water from the brain parenchyma into the intravascular space. Rheological effects also cause reduce blood viscosity, and promote plasma expansion and cerebral oxygen delivery. In response, cerebral vasoconstriction occurs due to autoregulation, and cerebral blood volume is decreased. Brain parenchyma volume is decreased, leading to ICP reduced.

== Medical uses ==
=== Acute kidney failure ===
Osmotic diuretic may be indicated in management of acute renal failure when GFR is reduced to such an extent that virtually all water and NaCl reabsorption occurs already in the proximal tubule and next to no tubular fluid flow reaches more distal segments of the nephron and urine output ceases. Such a scenario results in deposition of protein onto the luminal surfaces of the tubules which may then subsequently obstruct tubular fluid flow.

Prompt administration of osmotic diuretics (e.g. 12-15 g IV mannitol) during the early stages of the disease process may increase GFR and tubular fluid flow, reducing the risk of this complication.

Osmotic diuretics are contraindicated in individuals who are anuric due to severe renal disease.

== Adverse effects ==
Osmotic diuretics may cause hyponatraemia (by drawing water into the extracellular space) or dehydration and hypernatraemia (by causing greater water diuresis than natriuresis). Osmotic diuretics commonly cause headache, nausea, and vomiting which may be a consequence of hyponatraemia. Increased blood volume may precipitate left heart failure. Extracellular fluid volume expansion may precipitate pulmonary edema in individuals with heart failure, or pulmonary congestion.

== See also ==
- Osmosis
