= Pars ascendens =

Pars ascendens may refer to:

- Ascending aorta, also known by the Latin term pars ascendens aortae
- Ascending limb of loop of Henle, also known by the Latin term pars ascendens ansa nephrica
