= Pars descendens =

Pars descendens may refer to:

- Descending aorta, also known by the Latin term pars descendens aortae
- Descending limb of loop of Henle, also known by the Latin term pars descendens ansa nephrica
