= Spiral ligament =

Fibrous cushion located in the inner ear in humans

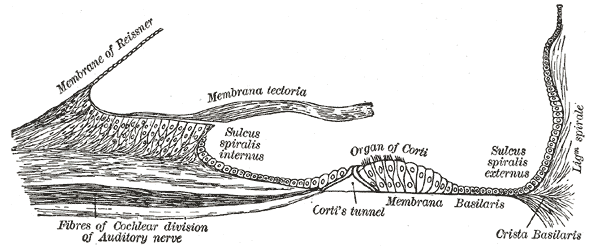
- Floor of ductus cochlearis.

Details

Identifiers
- Latin: ligamentum spirale ductus cochlearis
- MeSH: D055493
- TA98: A15.3.03.099
- TA2: 7030
- FMA: 77834

The spiral ligament is a fibrous cushion located between the stria vascularis and the bony otic capsule.

The periosteum, forming the outer wall of the cochlear duct (Latin: ductus cochlearis), is greatly thickened and altered in character.

== Additional images ==
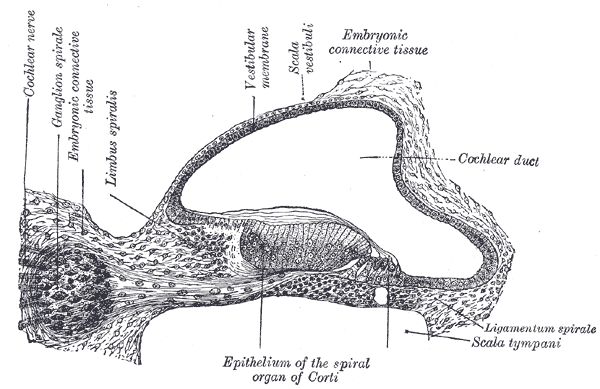
Transverse section of the cochlear duct of a fetal cat.

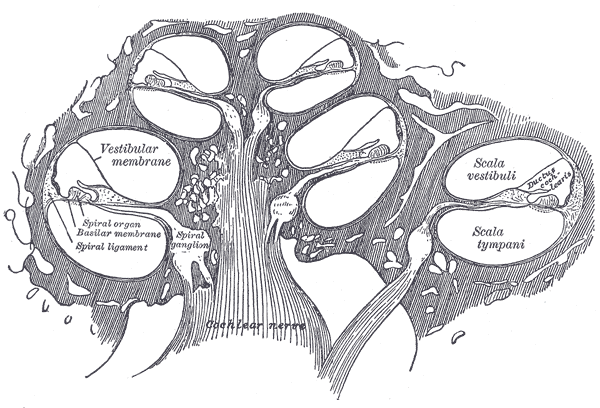
Diagrammatic longitudinal section of the cochlea.
