= Na–K–Cl cotransporter =

Group of transport proteins

solute carrier family 12 member 1

Identifiers
- Symbol: SLC12A1
- Alt. symbols: NKCC2
- NCBI gene: 6557
- HGNC: 10910
- OMIM: 600839
- Orthologs: 286
- RefSeq: NM_000338
- UniProt: Q13621

Other data
- Locus: Chr. 15 q21.1
Search for
- Structures: Swiss-model
- Domains: InterPro

solute carrier family 12 member 2

Identifiers
- Symbol: SLC12A2
- Alt. symbols: NKCC1
- NCBI gene: 6558
- HGNC: 10911
- OMIM: 600840
- Orthologs: 20283
- RefSeq: NM_001046
- UniProt: P55011

Other data
- Locus: Chr. 5 q23.3
Search for
- Structures: Swiss-model
- Domains: InterPro

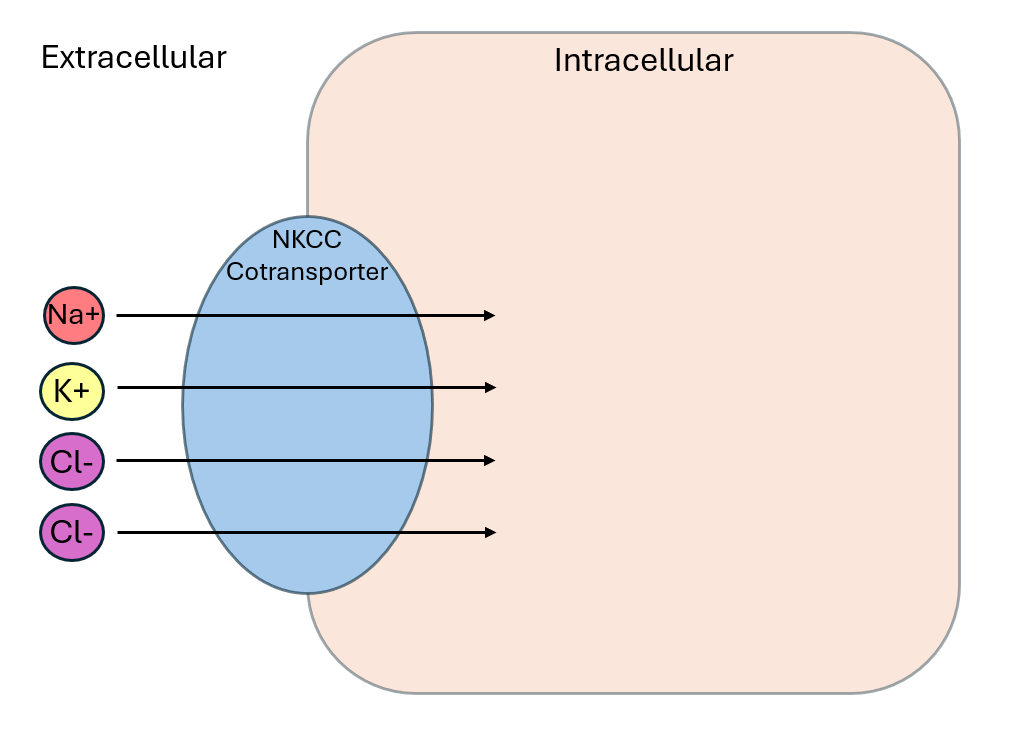
The basic function of the Na-K-Cl cotransporter (NKCC).

The Na–K–Cl cotransporter (NKCC) is a transport protein that aids in the secondary active transport of sodium, potassium, and chloride into cells. In humans there are two isoforms of this membrane transport protein, NKCC1 and NKCC2, encoded by two different genes (SLC12A2 and SLC12A1 respectively). Two isoforms of the NKCC1/Slc12a2 gene result from keeping (isoform 1) or skipping (isoform 2) exon 21 in the final gene product.

NKCC1 is widely distributed throughout the human body; it has important functions in organs that secrete fluids. In contrast, NKCC2 is found specifically in the kidney, where it extracts sodium, potassium, and chloride from the urine so they can be reabsorbed into the blood.

== Function ==
NKCC proteins are membrane transport proteins that transport sodium (Na), potassium (K), and chloride (Cl) ions across the cell membrane. Because they move each solute in the same direction, they are considered symporters. They maintain electroneutrality by moving two positively charged solutes (sodium and potassium) alongside two parts of a negatively charged solute (chloride). Thus the stoichiometry of the transported solutes is 1Na:1K:2Cl. Although squid giant axons are the only notable exception with a stoichiometry of 2Na:1K:3Cl, electroneutrality across the protein transporter is still maintained. The rate of transport of these ions are regulated by phosphorylation sites, which present on both NKCC isoforms.

=== NKCC1 ===
The NKCC1 isoform consists of about 1,200 amino acids, with about 500 amino acids residues giving rise to twelve hydrophobic transmembrane regions. However, evidence of a shorter NKCC1 mRNA transcript (6.7 kb to 7-7.5 kb) in skeletal muscle cells gives support that further NKCC1 variants exists in a tissue-specific manner. The carboxy-terminal of the NKCC1 cotransporter contains multiple phosphorylation sites and is highly conserved across species, while in contrast, the amino-terminal contains at least one phosphorylation site and is poorly conserved across species.Focusing on the transmembrane regions, mutagenesis-driven affinity studies have revealed the second transmembrane region as the determinant of cation affinity, while chloride affinity was determined by transmembrane regions four through seven. Additionally, bumetanide, a loop diuretic, was found to bind to transmembrane regions 2 through 7, 11, and 12.

NKCC1 is widely distributed throughout the body, especially in organs that secrete fluids, called exocrine glands. In cells of these organs, NKCC1 is commonly found in the basolateral membrane, the part of the cell membrane closest to the blood vessels. Exon 21 possesses a translocation sequence that targets NKCC1 to the basolateral membrane. Thus, NKCC1 cotransporters that have been alternatively spliced to exclude exon 21 will be translocated to the apical membrane rather than the basolateral membrane. Its basolateral location gives NKCC1 the ability to transport sodium, potassium, and chloride from the blood into the cell. Other transporters assist in the movement of these solutes out of the cell through its apical surface. The end result is that solutes from the blood, particularly chloride, are secreted into the lumen of these exocrine glands, increasing the luminal concentration of solutes and causing water to be secreted by osmosis.

In addition to exocrine glands, NKCC1 is necessary for establishing the potassium-rich endolymph that bathes part of the cochlea, an organ necessary for hearing. Inhibition of NKCC1, as with furosemide or other loop diuretics, can result in deafness. Specifically in the cochlea, NKCC1 is present in the stria vascularis, spiral ligament, and spiral ganglia. Similarly, NKCC1 expression decreases with aging, resulting in progressive hearing loss. Additionally, NKCC1 is present in the dark cells of the vestibule and contributes to generation of the endolymph of the vestibular system.

NKCC1 is also expressed in many regions of the brain during early development, but not in adulthood. This change in NKCC1 presence seems to be responsible for altering responses to the neurotransmitters GABA and glycine from excitatory to inhibitory, which was suggested to be important for early neuronal development. As long as NKCC1 transporters are predominantly active, internal chloride concentrations in neurons is raised in comparison with mature chloride concentrations, which is important for GABA and glycine responses, as respective ligand-gated anion channels are permeable to chloride. With higher internal chloride concentrations, outward driving force for this ions increases, and thus channel opening leads to chloride leaving the cell, thereby depolarizing it. Put another way, increasing internal chloride concentration increases the reversal potential for chloride, given by the Nernst equation. Later in development expression of NKCC1 is reduced, while expression of a KCC2 K-Cl cotransporter increased, thus bringing internal chloride concentration in neurons down to adult values.

Activity-dependent regulation of NKCC1 during early neuronal development has been suggested to contribute, together with the upregulation of KCC2, to the developmental shift of GABAergic signalling from depolarizing to hyperpolarizing responses.

NKCC1 has been identified in Sertoli cells, spermatocytes, and spermatids in the male reproductive system. NKCC1 function appears to be critical for spermatogenesis, as knockdown of NKCC1 in mice results in spermatocytes failing to mature into spermatozoa, resulting in infertility. Additionally, the NKCC1 knockdown mice also exhibit a decreased testicle size compared to wild-type mice. The mechanism behind NKCC1-dependent male fertility is unclear, it is possible that the observed decreased sperm count could be due to either lack of NKCC1 cotransport in the testis or upstream failure of NKCC1-expressing neurons in the hypothalamus to release gonadotropin-releasing hormone.

=== NKCC2 ===
The NKCC2 isoform is smaller than NKCC1, 121 kDa versus 195 kDa, respectively, primarily because NKCC2 does not contain an 80 amino acid sequence present on the N-terminus of NKCC1. Additionally, the NKCC2 isoform does not contain exon 21, which results in NKCC2 being translocated to the apical membrane. Compared to NKCC1, exon 1 is divided into two separate exons in NKCC2 and exon 4 is alternatively spliced into forms A, B, and F, which are all exclusive to NKCC2. NKCC2 expression is thought to be limited to renal cells, although this has been called into question with possible NKCC2 expression in pancreatic β-cells.

NKCC2 is specifically found in cells of the thick ascending limb of the loop of Henle and the macula densa in nephrons, the basic functional units of the kidney. Within these cells, NKCC2 resides in the apical membrane abutting the nephron's lumen, which is the hollow space containing urine. It thus serves both in sodium absorption and in tubuloglomerular feedback.

The thick ascending limb of the loop of Henle begins at the deeper portion of the renal outer medulla. Here, the urine has a relatively high concentration of sodium. As urine moves towards the more superficial portion of the thick ascending limb, NKCC2 is the major transport protein by which sodium is reabsorbed from the urine. This outward movement of sodium and the lack of water permeability in the thick ascending limb, creates a more diluted urine. According to the stoichiometry outlined above, each sodium ion reabsorbed brings one potassium ion and two chloride ions. Sodium goes on to be reabsorbed into the blood, where it contributes to the maintenance of blood pressure.

Furosemide and other loop diuretics inhibit the activity of NKCC2, thereby impairing sodium reabsorption in the thick ascending limb of the loop of Henle. The action of these loop diuretics also reduces potassium reabsorption through the NKCC2 cotransporter and consequently increases tubular flow rate which enhances potassium secretion and emphasises the hypokalaemic effect.

Impaired sodium reabsorption increases diuresis by three mechanisms:

1. Increases the amount of active osmolytes in urine by decreasing absorption of sodium
2. Erases the papillar gradient
3. Inhibits tubuloglomerular feedback

Loop diuretics therefore ultimately result in decreased blood pressure.

The hormone vasopressin also stimulates the activity of NKCC2. Vasopressin stimulates sodium chloride reabsorption in the thick ascending limb of the nephron by activating signaling pathways. Vasopressin increases the traffic of NKCC2 to the membrane and phosphorylates some serine and threonine sites on the cytoplasmic N-terminal of the NKCC2 located in the membrane, increasing its activity. Increased NKCC2 activity aids in water reabsorption in the collecting duct through aquaporin 2 channels by creating a hypo-osmotic filtrate.

== Genetics ==
NKCC1 and NKCC2 are encoded by genes on the long arms of chromosomes 5 and 15, respectively. A loss of function mutation of NKCC2 produces Bartter syndrome, an autosomal recessive disorder characterized by hypokalemic metabolic alkalosis with normal to low blood pressure.

The promotor for gene SLC12A2, which encodes for NKCC1, contains binding sites for homeobox transcription factors SIX1 and SIX4, which have been shown to upregulate NKCC1 mRNA expression when bound. Additionally, NKCC1 expression is upregulated when the SLC12A2 promoter is hypomethylated due to transcription factor Sp1 binding.

Unlike SLC12A2, the promotor for gene SLC12A1, which encodes for NKCC2, does not contain either a TATA box or Sp1 binding sites. Regulatory binding sites in the NKCC2 promotor include sites for hepatocyte nuclear factor 1, cAMP-response element binding protein, CCAAT-enhancer binding proteins, and basic helix-loop-helix proteins.

== Kinetics ==
The energy required to move solutes across the cell membrane is provided by the electrochemical gradient of sodium. Sodium's electrochemical gradient is established by the Na/K-ATPase, which is an ATP-dependent enzyme. Since NKCC proteins use sodium's gradient, their activity is indirectly dependent on ATP; for this reason, NKCC proteins are said to move solutes by way of secondary active transport. There are three isoforms of NKCC2 created by alternative splicing (NKCC2A, B and F). Each one of these isoforms is expressed at different portions of the thick ascending limb and they have different affinity for sodium that correlates with its localization. The isoform F is more predominant in the deeper portion of the thick ascending limb, where the sodium concentration is very high. NKCC2F is the isoform with the lowest affinity for sodium and this allows the cotransporter to work at this sodium rich environment. Conversely, NKCC2B is expressed at the more superficial portion of the thick ascending limb and the macula densa, and it has the highest affinity for sodium. This permits NKCC2B to function in this sodium-depleted environment without saturating. The NKCC2A isoform shows an intermediate distribution and affinity for sodium. In this way, NKCC2 is able to function properly along the range of sodium concentrations found along the thick ascending limb.

== See also ==
- Cotransport
- Cotransporter
