= Furosemide =

Loop diuretic medication

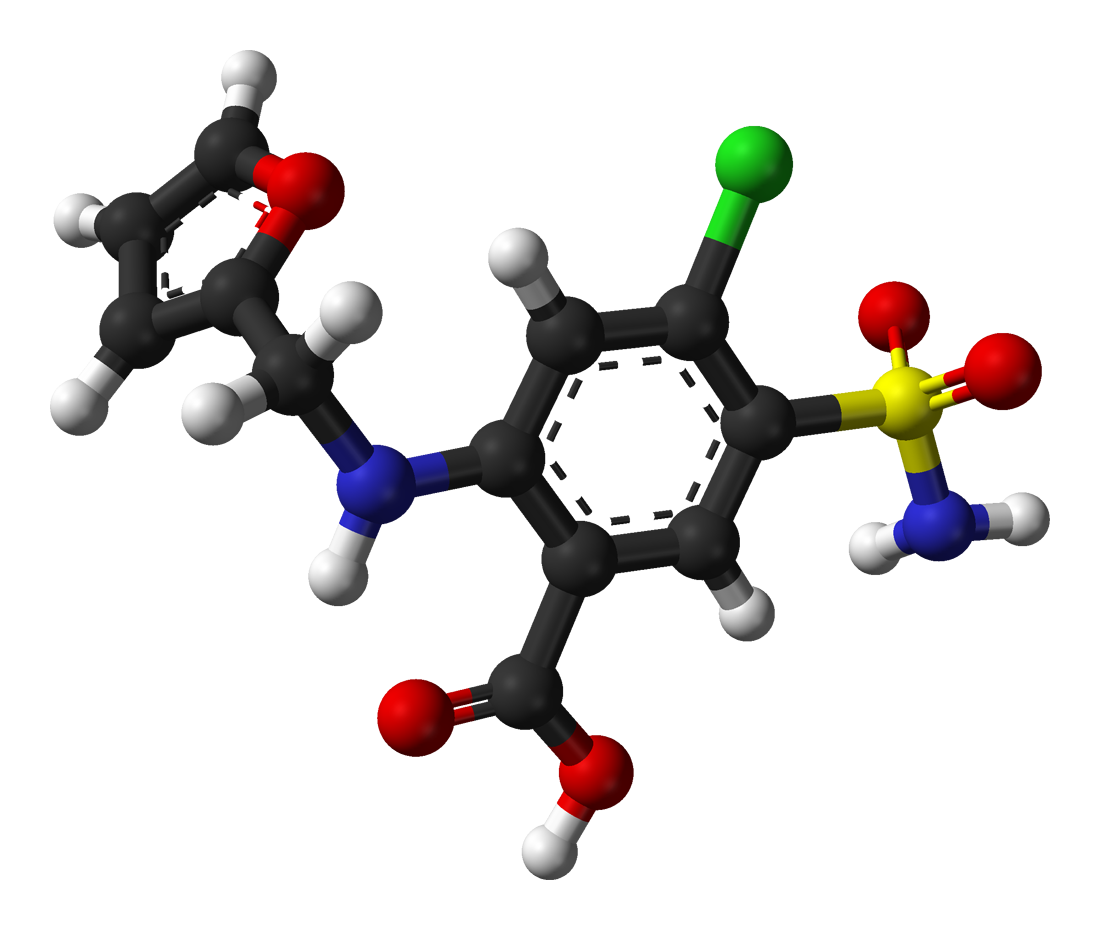

Clinical data
- Pronunciation: /fjʊˈroʊsəˌmaɪd/
- Trade names: Lasix, others
- AHFS/Drugs.com: Monograph
- MedlinePlus: a682858
- License data: US DailyMed: Furosemide
- Pregnancy category: AU: C
- Routes of administration: Oral (PO), intravenous (IV), intramuscular (IM), subcutaneous (SC)
- ATC code: C03CA01 (WHO)

Legal status
- Legal status: AU: S4 (Prescription only); UK: POM (Prescription only); US: ℞-only; EU: Rx-only; In general: ℞ (Prescription only)

Pharmacokinetic data
- Bioavailability: 43–69%
- Protein binding: 91–99%
- Metabolism: Liver and kidney glucuronidation
- Onset of action: PO: 30–60 min, IV: 5 min
- Elimination half-life: up to 100 minutes
- Excretion: Kidney (66%), bile duct (33%)

Identifiers
- IUPAC name: 4-Chloro-2-[(furan-2-ylmethyl)amino]-5-sulfamoylbenzoic acid
- CAS Number: 54-31-9
- PubChem CID: 3440
- DrugBank: DB00695
- ChemSpider: 3322
- UNII: 7LXU5N7ZO5
- KEGG: D00331
- ChEBI: CHEBI:47426
- ChEMBL: ChEMBL35
- CompTox Dashboard (EPA): DTXSID6020648
- ECHA InfoCard: 100.000.185

Chemical and physical data
- Formula: C_{12}H_{11}ClN_{2}O_{5}S
- Molar mass: 330.74 g·mol^{−1}
- 3D model (JSmol): Interactive image
- SMILES: o1cccc1CNc(cc2Cl)c(C(=O)O)cc2S(=O)(=O)N
- InChI: InChI=1S/C12H11ClN2O5S/c13-9-5-10(15-6-7-2-1-3-20-7)8(12(16)17)4-11(9)21(14,18)19/h1-5,15H,6H2,(H,16,17)(H2,14,18,19); Key:ZZUFCTLCJUWOSV-UHFFFAOYSA-N

Furosemide, sold under the brand name Lasix among others, is a loop diuretic medication used to treat edema due to heart failure, liver scarring, or kidney disease. Furosemide may also be used for the treatment of high blood pressure. It can be taken intravenously or orally. When given intravenously, furosemide typically takes effect within five minutes; when taken orally, it typically metabolizes within an hour.

Common side effects include orthostatic hypotension (decrease in blood pressure while standing, and associated lightheadedness), tinnitus (ringing in the ears), and photosensitivity (sensitivity to light). Potentially serious side effects include electrolyte abnormalities, low blood pressure, and hearing loss. It is recommended that serum electrolytes (especially potassium), serum CO_{2}, creatinine, BUN levels, and liver and kidney functioning be monitored in patients taking furosemide. It is also recommended to be alert for the occurrence of any potential blood dyscrasias.

Furosemide works by decreasing the reabsorption of sodium by the kidneys. Common side effects of furosemide injection include hypokalemia (low potassium level), hypotension (low blood pressure), and dizziness.

Furosemide was patented in 1959 and approved for medical use in 1964. It is on the World Health Organization's List of Essential Medicines. In the United States, it is available as a generic medication. In 2023, it was the 29th most commonly prescribed medication in the United States, with more than 19 million prescriptions. In 2020/21 it was the twentieth most prescribed medication in England. It is on the World Anti-Doping Agency's banned drug list due to concerns that it may mask other drugs. It has also been used in race horses for the treatment and prevention of exercise-induced pulmonary hemorrhage.

== Medical uses ==
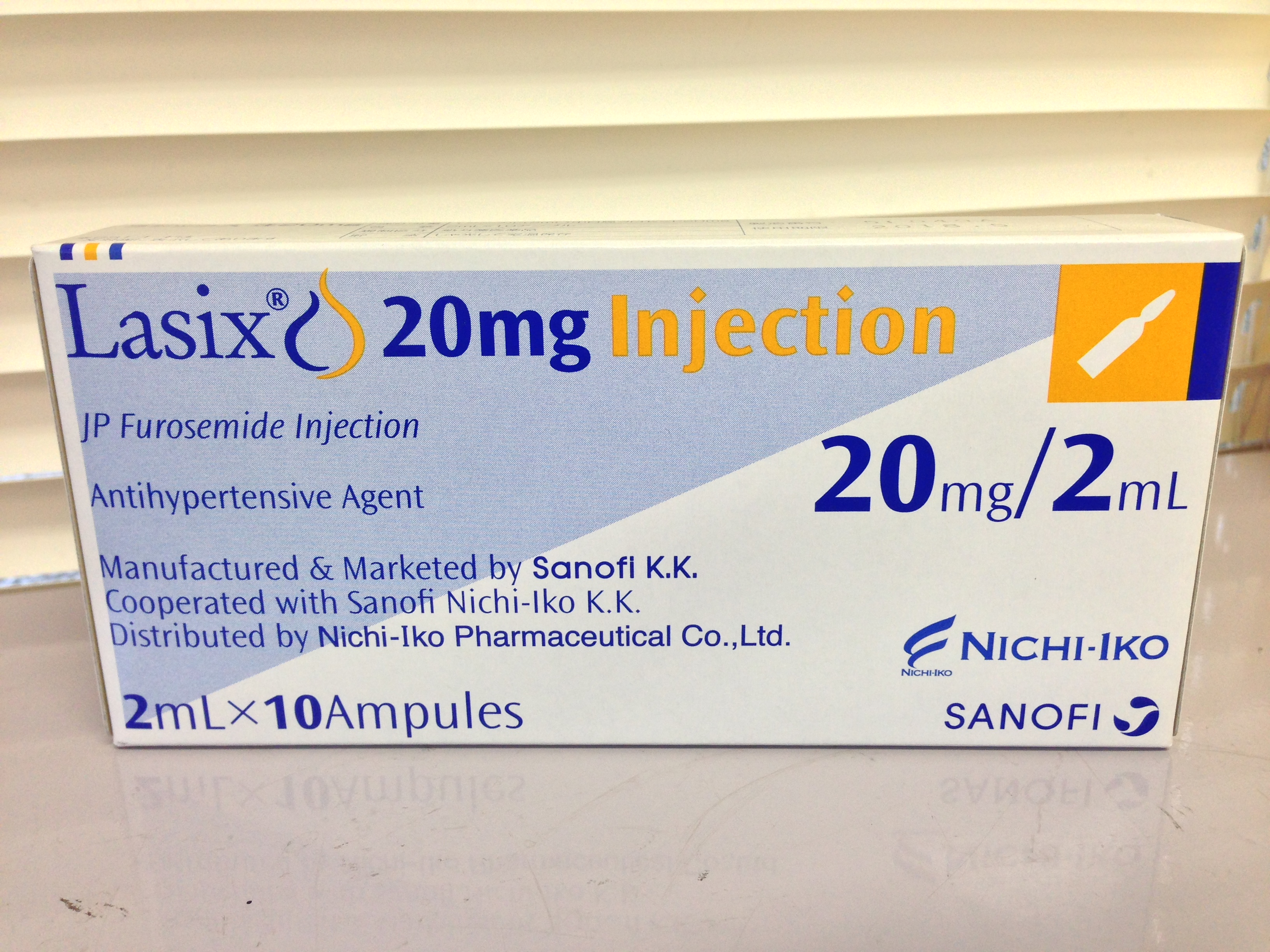
Furosemide (Lasix) for injection.

Furosemide is primarily used for the treatment of edema, but also in some cases of hypertension (where there is also kidney or heart impairment). It is often viewed as a first-line agent in most people with edema caused by congestive heart failure because of its anti-vasoconstrictor and diuretic effects. Compared to furosemide, torasemide may lower rehospitalisations and reduce symptoms of heart failure in some patients with acute or chronic heart failure, depending on individualised situations. However, there has been no evidence that torsemide reduces the risk of death. Torsemide may also be safer than furosemide. Current studies suggest that self-administered subcutaneous frusemide may be a feasible alternative to intravenous diuresis in selected patients with chronic heart failure and may reduce healthcare use and costs. However, current evidence remains limited, and no large randomised controlled trial has shown a statistically significant reduction in hospitalisation or mortality rates compared with standard IV therapy.

Furosemide is also used for liver cirrhosis, kidney impairment, nephrotic syndrome, in adjunct therapy for swelling of the brain or lungs where rapid diuresis is required (IV injection), and in the management of severe hypercalcemia in combination with adequate rehydration.

=== Kidney disease ===
In chronic kidney diseases with hypoalbuminemia, furosemide is used along with albumin to increase diuresis. It is also used along with albumin in nephrotic syndrome to reduce edema.

=== Other information ===
Furosemide is mainly excreted by tubular secretion in the kidney. In kidney impairment, clearance is reduced, increasing the risk of adverse effects. Lower initial doses are recommended in older patients (to minimize side effects) and high doses may be needed in kidney failure. It can also cause kidney damage; this is mainly by loss of excessive fluid (i.e., dehydration), and is usually reversible.

Furosemide acts within 1 hour of oral administration (after IV injection, the peak effect is within 30 minutes). Diuresis is usually complete within 6–8 hours of oral administration, but there is significant variation between individuals.

== Adverse effects ==
Furosemide also can lead to gout caused by hyperuricemia. Hyperglycemia is also a common side effect.

The tendency, as for all loop diuretics, to cause low serum potassium concentration (hypokalemia) has given rise to combination products, either with potassium or with the potassium-sparing diuretic amiloride (Co-amilofruse). Other electrolyte abnormalities that can result from furosemide use include hyponatremia, hypochloremia, hypomagnesemia, and hypocalcemia.

In the treatment of heart failure, many studies have shown that the long-term use of furosemide can cause varying degrees of thiamine deficiency, so thiamine supplementation is also suggested.

Furosemide has been associated with ototoxicity in post-marketing reports and observational studies. One observational study reported that furosemide use was associated with a 40% increased likelihood of developing hearing loss and a 33% increased likelihood of progression of existing mild-to-moderate hearing loss over a 10-year period. However, age itself is a major risk factor for hearing loss, with the risk approximately doubling for every additional 5 years of age. Consequently, the magnitude of the independent risk attributable to furosemide remains uncertain. A 2025 pharmacovigilance study suggested that hearing disturbances associated with furosemide are relatively uncommon and may occur less frequently compared with other loop diuretics such as torsemide and bumetanide. Nevertheless, the study continued to demonstrate an association between furosemide and ototoxic effects, consistent with findings from earlier studies.

Other precautions include nephrotoxicity, sulfonamide (sulfa) allergy, and increased free thyroid hormone effects with large doses.

== Interactions ==
Furosemide has potential interactions with these medications:

- Aspirin and other salicylates
- Other diuretics (e.g. ethacrynic acid, hydrochlorothiazide)
- Synergistic effects with other antihypertensives (e.g. doxazosin)
- Sucralfate

Potentially hazardous interactions with other drugs:

- Analgesics: increased risk of kidney damage (nephrotoxicity) with nonsteroidal anti-inflammatory drugs; antagonism of diuretic effect with NSAIDs
- Antiarrhythmics: a risk of cardiac toxicity exists with antiarrhythmics if hypokalemia occurs; the effects of lidocaine and mexiletine are antagonized.
- Antibacterials: increased risk of ototoxicity with aminoglycosides, polymyxins and vancomycin; avoid concomitant use with lymecycline
- Antidepressants: increased risk of hypokalemia with reboxetine; enhanced hypotensive effect with MAOIs; increased risk of postural hypotension with tricyclic antidepressants
- Antiepileptics: increased risk of hyponatremia with carbamazepine
- Antifungals: increased risk of hypokalemia with amphotericin
- Antihypertensives: enhanced hypotensive effect; increased risk of first dose hypotensive effect with alpha-blockers; increased risk of ventricular arrhythmias with sotalol if hypokalemia occurs
- Antipsychotics: increased risk of ventricular arrhythmias with amisulpride, sertindole, or pimozide (avoid with pimozide) if hypokalemia occurs; enhanced hypotensive effect with phenothiazines
- Atomoxetine: hypokalemia increases risk of ventricular arrhythmias
- Cardiac glycosides: increased toxicity if hypokalemia occurs
- Cyclosporine: variable reports of increased nephrotoxicity, ototoxicity and hepatotoxicity
- Lithium: risk of toxicity.

== Mechanism of action ==
Furosemide, like other loop diuretics, acts by inhibiting the luminal Na–K–Cl cotransporter in the thick ascending limb of the loop of Henle, by binding to the Na-K-2Cl transporter, thus causing more sodium, chloride, and potassium to be excreted in the urine.

The action on the distal tubules is independent of any inhibitory effect on carbonic anhydrase or aldosterone; it also abolishes the corticomedullary osmotic gradient and blocks negative, as well as positive, free water clearance. Because of the large NaCl absorptive capacity of the loop of Henle, diuresis is not limited by the development of acidosis, as it is with the carbonic anhydrase inhibitors.

Additionally, furosemide is a noncompetitive subtype-specific blocker of GABA-A receptors. Furosemide has been reported to reversibly antagonize GABA-evoked currents of α_{6}β_{2}γ_{2} receptors at μM concentrations, but not α_{1}β_{2}γ_{2} receptors. During development, the α_{6}β_{2}γ_{2} receptor increases in expression in cerebellar granule neurons, corresponding to increased sensitivity to furosemide.

== Pharmacokinetics ==
- Molecular weight (daltons) 330.7
- % Bioavailability 47 – 70%
  - Bioavailability with end-stage renal disease 43 – 46%
- % Protein binding 91 – 99
- Volume of distribution (L/kg) 0.07 – 0.2
  - Volume of distribution may be higher in patients with cirrhosis or nephrotic syndrome
- Excretion
  - % Excreted in urine (% of total dose) 60 – 90
  - % Excreted unchanged in urine (% of total dose) 53.1 – 58.8
  - % Excreted in feces (% of total dose) 7 – 9
  - % Excreted in bile (% of total dose) 6 – 9
- Approximately 10% is metabolized by the liver in healthy individuals, but this percentage may be greater in individuals with severe kidney failure
- Renal clearance (mL/min/kg) 2.0
- Elimination half-life (hrs) 2
  - Prolonged in congestive heart failure (mean 3.4 hrs)
  - Prolonged in severe kidney failure (4 – 6 hrs) and anephric patients (1.5 – 9 hrs)
- Time to peak concentration (hrs)
  - Intravenous administration 0.3
  - Oral solution 0.83
  - Oral tablet 1.45

The pharmacokinetics of furosemide are not significantly altered by food.

No direct relationship has been found between furosemide concentration in the plasma and furosemide efficacy. Efficacy depends upon the concentration of furosemide in urine.

== Names ==
Furosemide is the INN and BAN. The previous BAN was frusemide.

Brand names under which furosemide is marketed include Aisemide, Apo-Furosemide, Beronald, Desdemin, Discoid, Diural, Diurapid, Dryptal, Durafurid, Edemid, Errolon, Eutensin, Farsiretic, Flusapex, Frudix, Frusemide, Frusetic, Frusid, Fulsix, Fuluvamide, Furantril, Furesis, Furix, Furo-Puren, Furon, Furosedon, Fusid.frusone, Hydro-rapid, Impugan, Katlex, Lasilix, Lasix, Lodix, Lowpston, Macasirool, Mirfat, Nicorol, Odemase, Oedemex, Profemin, Rosemide, Rusyde, Salix, Seguril, Teva-Furosemide, Trofurit, Uremide, and Urex.

== Veterinary uses ==
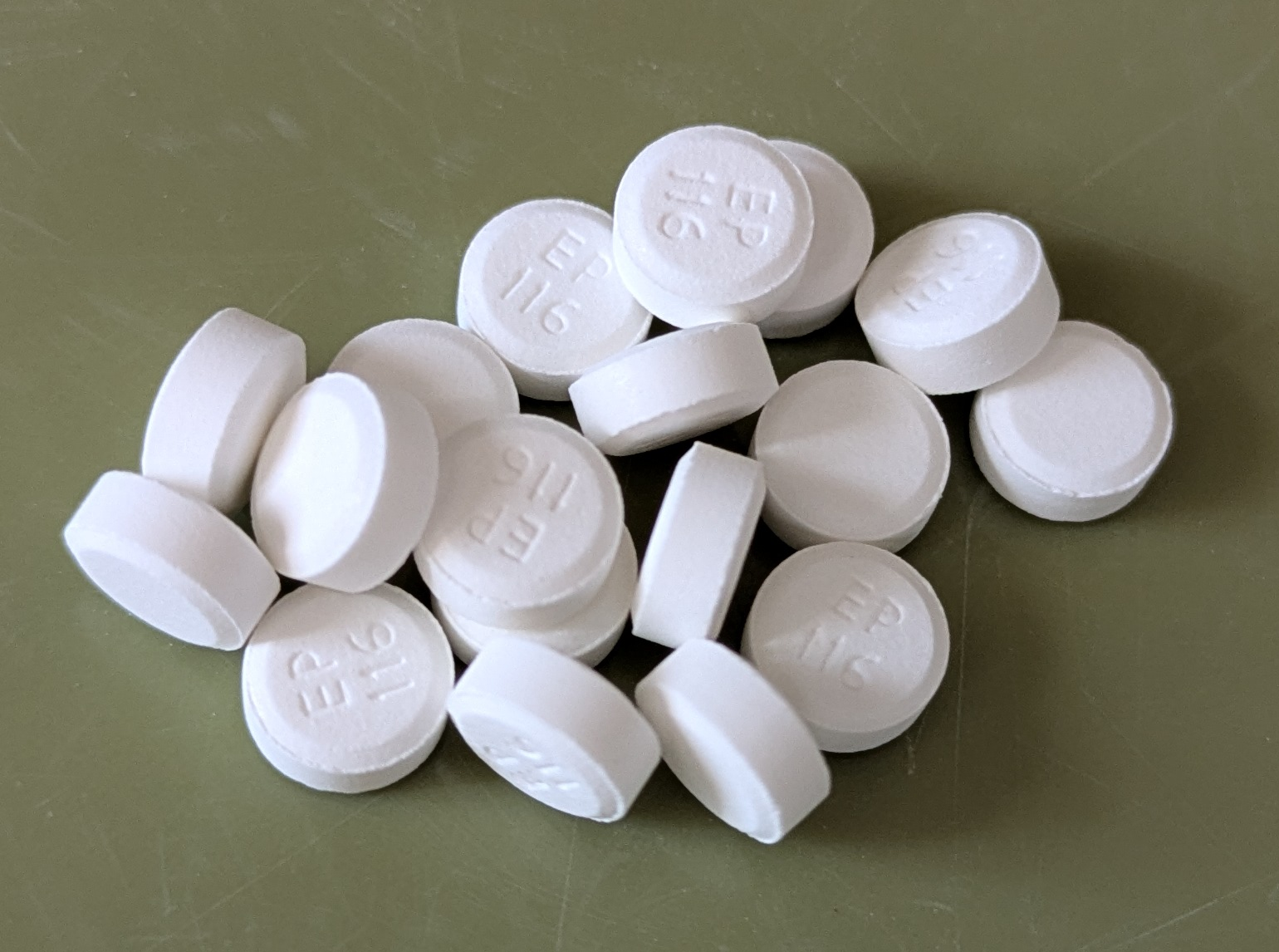
Furosemide for feline use

The diuretic effects are put to use most commonly in horses to prevent bleeding during a race. In the United States of America, under the racing rules of most states, horses that bleed from the nostrils (exercise-induced pulmonary hemorrhage) three times are permanently barred from racing. Sometime in the early 1970s, furosemide's ability to prevent, or at least greatly reduce, the incidence of bleeding by horses during races was discovered accidentally. Clinical trials followed, and by the decade's end, racing commissions in some states in the USA began legalizing its use on race horses. In 1995, New York became the last state in the United States to approve such use, after years of refusing to consider doing so. Some states allow its use for all racehorses; some allow it only for confirmed "bleeders". Its use for this purpose is still prohibited in many other countries.

Furosemide is also used in horses for pulmonary edema, congestive heart failure (in combination with other drugs), and allergic reactions. Although it increases circulation to the kidneys, it does not help kidney function and is not recommended for kidney disease.

It is also used to treat congestive heart failure (pulmonary edema, pleural effusion, and/or ascites) in cats and dogs.

=== Horses ===
Furosemide is injected either intramuscularly or intravenously. It can cause dehydration and electrolyte imbalance, including loss of potassium, calcium, sodium, and magnesium.

Furosemide is detectable in urine 36–72 hours following injection. Its use is restricted by most equestrian organizations.

US major racetracks ban the use of furosemide on race days.
