= Ototoxicity =

- Specialty: Otorhinolaryngology

Ototoxicity is the property of being toxic to the ear (oto-), specifically the cochlea or auditory nerve and sometimes the vestibular system, for example, as a side effect of a drug. The effects of ototoxicity can be reversible and temporary, or irreversible and permanent. It has been recognized since the 19th century. There are many well-known ototoxic drugs used in clinical situations, and they are prescribed, despite the risk of hearing disorders, for very serious health conditions. Ototoxic drugs include aminoglycoside antibiotics (such as gentamicin, streptomycin, tobramycin), loop diuretics (such as furosemide), and platinum-based chemotherapy agents (such as cisplatin and carboplatin). A number of nonsteroidal anti-inflammatory drugs (NSAIDs) have also been shown to be ototoxic. This can result in sensorineural hearing loss, dysequilibrium, or both. Some environmental and occupational chemicals have also been shown to affect the auditory system and interact with noise.

== Signs and symptoms ==
Ototoxicity results in cochlear and/or vestibular dysfunction which can manifest as sensorineural hearing loss, tinnitus, hyperacusis, dizziness, vertigo, or imbalance. Presentation of symptoms vary in singularity, onset, severity and reversibility.

=== Auditory symptoms ===
==== Hearing loss ====
Ototoxicity-induced hearing loss typically impacts the high frequency range, affecting above 8000 Hz prior to impacting frequencies below. There is not a global consensus on measuring severity of ototoxicity-induced hearing loss as there are many criteria available to define and measure ototoxicity-induced hearing loss. Guidelines and criteria differ between children and adults.

===== Ototoxicity grades (Hearing Loss) =====
There are at least 13 classifications for ototoxicity. Examples of ototoxicity grades for hearing loss are the National Cancer Institute's Common Terminology Criteria for Adverse Events (CTCAE), Brock's Hearing Loss Grades, Tune grading system, and Chang grading system.

National Cancer Institute (NCI) Common Terminology Criteria for Adverse Events (CTCAE) (as described in the American Academy of Audiology Ototoxicity Monitoring Guidelines from 2009):

- Grade 1: Threshold shift or loss of 15–25 dB relative to baseline, averaged at two or more contiguous frequencies in at least one ear
- Grade 2: Threshold shift or loss of >25-90 dB, averaged at two contiguous test frequencies in at least one ear
- Grade 3: Hearing loss sufficient to indicate aural rehabilitation such as hearing aids and/or speech-language services
- Grade 4: Indications of cochlear implant candidacy

Brock's Hearing Loss Grades (as described in the American Academy of Audiology Ototoxicity Monitoring Guidelines from 2009):

- Grade 0: Hearing thresholds <40 dB at all frequencies
- Grade 1: Thresholds 40 dB or greater at 8000 Hz
- Grade 2: Thresholds 40 dB or greater at 4000-8000 Hz
- Grade 3: Thresholds 40 dB or greater at 2000-8000 Hz
- Grade 4: Thresholds 40 dB or greater at 1000-8000 Hz

Chang grading system (as reported in Ganesan et al., 2018):

- 0: ≤ 20 dB at 1, 2, and 4 kHz
- 1a: ≥ 40 dB at any frequency 6 to 12 kHz
- 1b: > 20 and < 40 dB at 4 kHz
- 2a: ≥ 40 dB at 4 kHz and above
- 2b: > 20 and < 40 dB at any frequency below 4 kHz
- 3: ≥ 40 dB at 2 or 3 kHz and above
- 4: ≥ 40 dB at 1 kHz and above

Tune grading system (as reported in Ganesan et al., 2018):

- 0: No hearing loss
- 1a: Threshold shift of ≥ 10 dB at 8, 10, and 12.5 kHz
- 1b: Threshold shift of ≥ 10 dB at 1, 2, and 4 kHz
- 2a: Threshold shift of ≥ 20 dB at 8, 10, and 12.5 kHz
- 2b: Threshold shift of ≥ 20 dB at 1, 2, and 4 kHz
- 3: ≥ 35 dB HL at 1, 2, and 4 kHz
- 4: ≥ 70 dB HL at 1, 2, and 4 kHz

==== Hyperacusis ====
Hyperacusis is abnormally increased sensitivity to intensity (perceived as loudness) to what is typically deemed as normal/tolerable loudness.

=== Vestibular symptoms ===
Vestibular symptoms from ototoxicity, which would specifically be vestibulotoxicity, can include general dizziness, vertigo, imbalance, and oscillopsia.

== Ototoxic agents ==
=== Antibiotics ===
Antibiotics in the aminoglycoside class, such as gentamicin and tobramycin, may produce cochleotoxicity through a poorly understood mechanism. It may result from antibiotic binding to NMDA receptors in the cochlea and damaging neurons through excitotoxicity. Aminoglycoside-induced production of reactive oxygen species may also injure cells of the cochlea. Once-daily dosing and co-administration of N-acetylcysteine may protect against aminoglycoside-induced ototoxicity. The anti-bacterial activity of aminoglycoside compounds is due to inhibition of ribosome function and these compounds similarly inhibit protein synthesis by mitochondrial ribosomes because mitochondria evolved from a bacterial ancestor. Consequently, aminoglycoside effects on production of reactive oxygen species as well as dysregulation of cellular calcium ion homeostasis may result from disruption of mitochondrial function. Ototoxicity of gentamicin can be exploited to treat some individuals with Ménière's disease by destroying the inner ear, which stops the vertigo attacks but causes permanent deafness. Due to the effects on mitochondria, certain inherited mitochondrial disorders result in increased sensitivity to the toxic effects of aminoglycosides.

Macrolide antibiotics, including erythromycin, are associated with reversible ototoxic effects. The underlying mechanism of ototoxicity may be impairment of ion transport in the stria vascularis. Predisposing factors include renal impairment, hepatic impairment, and recent organ transplantation.

=== Loop diuretics ===
Certain types of diuretics are associated with varying levels of risk for ototoxicity. Loop and thiazide diuretics carry this side effect. The loop diuretic furosemide is associated with ototoxicity, particularly when doses exceed 240 mg per hour. The related compound ethacrynic acid has a higher association with ototoxicity, and is therefore used only in patients with sulfa allergies. Diuretics are thought to alter the ionic gradient within the stria vascularis. Bumetanide confers a decreased risk of ototoxicity compared to furosemide.

=== Chemotherapeutic agents ===
Platinum-containing chemotherapeutic agents, including cisplatin and carboplatin, are associated with cochleotoxicity characterized by progressive, high-frequency hearing loss with or without tinnitus (ringing in the ears). Ototoxicity is less frequently seen with the related compound oxaliplatin. The severity of cisplatin-induced ototoxicity is dependent upon the cumulative dose administered and the age of the patient, with young children being most susceptible. The exact mechanism of cisplatin ototoxicity is not known. The drug is understood to damage multiple regions of the cochlea, causing the death of outer hair cells, as well as damage to the spiral ganglion neurons and cells of the stria vascularis. Long-term retention of cisplatin in the cochlea may contribute to the drug's cochleotoxic potential. Once inside the cochlea, cisplatin has been proposed to cause cellular toxicity through a number of different mechanisms, including through the production of reactive oxygen species. The decreased incidence of oxaliplatin ototoxicity has been attributed to decreased uptake of the drug by cells of the cochlea. Administration of amifostine has been used in attempts to prevent cisplatin-induced ototoxicity, but the American Society of Clinical Oncology recommends against its routine use.

The vinca alkaloids, including vincristine, are also associated with reversible ototoxicity.

=== Antiseptics and disinfectants ===
Topical skin preparations such as chlorhexidine and ethyl alcohol have the potential to be ototoxic should they enter the inner ear through the round window membrane. This potential was first noted after a small percentage of patients undergoing early myringoplasty operations experienced severe sensorineural hearing loss. It was found that in all operations involving this complication the preoperative sterilization was done with chlorhexidine. The ototoxicity of chlorhexidine was further confirmed by studies with animal models.

Several other skin preparations have been shown to be potentially ototoxic in the animal model. These preparations include acetic acid, propylene glycol, quaternary ammonium compounds, and any alcohol-based preparations. However, it is difficult to extrapolate these results to human ototoxicity because the human round window membrane is much thicker than in any animal model.

=== Other medicinal ototoxic drugs ===
At high doses, quinine, aspirin and other salicylates may also cause high-pitch tinnitus and hearing loss in both ears, typically reversible upon discontinuation of the drug. Erectile dysfunction medications may have the potential to cause hearing loss. However the link between erectile dysfunction medications and hearing loss remains uncertain.

Previous noise exposure has not been found to potentiate ototoxic hearing loss. The American Academy of Audiology includes in their position statement that exposure to noise at the same time as aminoglycosides may exacerbate ototoxicity. The American Academy of Audiology recommends people being treated with ototoxic chemotherapeutics avoid excessive noise levels during treatment and for several months following cessation of treatment. Opiates in combination with excessive noise levels may also have an additive effect on ototoxic hearing loss.

=== Ototoxicants in the environment and workplace ===
Ototoxic effects are also seen with quinine, pesticides, solvents, asphyxiants, and heavy metals such as mercury and lead. When combining multiple ototoxicants, the risk of hearing loss becomes greater. As these exposures are common, this hearing impairment can affect workers in many occupations and industries. This risk probably been overlook because individual hearing tests conducted on workers, pure tone audiometry, does not allow one to determine if a hearing effects are a consequence of noise or chemical exposure.

Examples of activities that often have exposures to both noise and solvents include:

- Printing
- Painting
- Construction
- Fueling vehicles and aircraft
- Firefighting
- Weapons firing
- Pesticide spraying

Ototoxic chemicals in the environment (from contaminated air or water) or in the workplace interact with mechanical stresses on the hair cells of the cochlea caused by noise in different ways. For mixtures containing organic solvents such as toluene, styrene or xylene, the combined exposure with noise increases the risk of occupational hearing loss in a synergistic manner. The risk is greatest when the co-exposure is with impulse noise. Carbon monoxide has been shown to increase the severity of the hearing loss from noise. Given the potential for enhanced risk of hearing loss, exposures and contact with products such as fuels, paint thinners, degreasers, white spirits, exhaust, should be kept to a minimum. Noise exposures should be kept below 85 decibels, and the chemical exposures should be below the recommended exposure limits given by regulatory agencies.

Drug exposures mixed with noise potentially lead to increased risk of ototoxic hearing loss. Noise exposure combined with the chemotherapeutic cisplatin puts individuals at increased risk of ototoxic hearing loss. Noise at 85 dB SPL or above added to the amount of hair cell death in the high frequency region of the cochlea in chinchillas.

The hearing loss caused by chemicals can be very similar to a hearing loss caused by excessive noise. A 2018 informational bulletin by the US Occupational Safety and Health Administration (OSHA) and the National Institute for Occupational Safety and Health (NIOSH) introduces the issue, provides examples of ototoxic chemicals, lists the industries and occupations at risk and provides prevention information. In 2025, information for the health management of workers exposed to ototoxic chemicals was posted in Wikiversity.

== Ototoxicity Monitoring/Management ==
Most published guidelines from around the world focus on the ototoxicity of medications, but there is not consensus on one universally agreed-upon protocol.

Guidelines released:

- The American Speech-Language-Hearing Association (ASHA) released guidelines in 1994. There are details on the different monitoring procedures on timelines depending on age and responsiveness.
- The American Academy of Audiology (AAA) released guidelines in 2009. There are details on the kinds of tests which can be used.
- The Health Professions Council of South Africa (HPSCA) released guidelines in 2018.

=== Auditory testing ===
Auditory testing involved in ototoxicity monitoring/management (OtoM) from medications is typically general audiological evaluation, high frequency audiometry (HFA), and otoacoustic emissions (OAEs). High frequency audiometry evaluates hearing thresholds beyond 8000 Hz, which is the typical cut-off for conventional audiometry. It is recommended a baseline evaluation be performed prior to treatment beginning.

==== Significant change criteria ====
There are several guidelines on what constitutes a significant change in hearing which can indicate further action must be taken, whether that be to implement aural rehabilitation or adjust the source of ototoxic exposure (eg. chemotherapy). With pure tone audiometry, ASHA considers a significant change to have occurred if there is a:

- ≥ 20 dB decrease in pure tone thresholds at any test frequency OR
- ≥ 10 dB decrease at two adjacent frequencies OR
- no response at three consecutive test frequencies where responses were previously obtained

If using distortion product otoacoustic emissions (DPOAEs), a significant shift is observed if there is a reduction in amplitude by 6 dB or more than the baseline within the sensitive range of ototoxicity.

=== Vestibular testing ===
Vestibular tests for vestibulotoxicity specifically can include caloric testing, rotational testing, vestibular evoked myogenic potentials (VEMPs), and computerized dynamic posturography (CDP); however, there are no globally accepted guidelines for monitoring/management of vestibular function during or following ototoxic treatments.

== See also ==
- Auditory system
- Neurotoxicity
- Audiology
