= Descending limb of loop of Henle =

Part of kidney anatomy

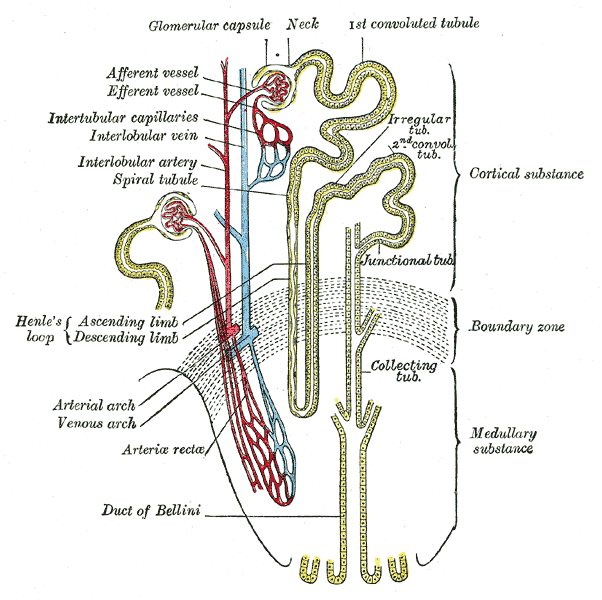
- Scheme of renal tubule and its vascular supply. (Labeled at center left.)

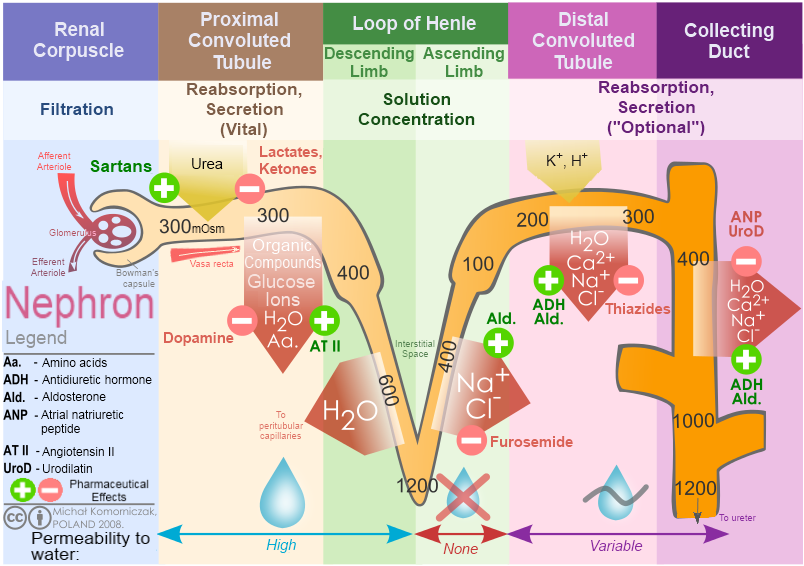
- Nephron ion flow diagram

Details

Identifiers
- Latin: pars descendens ansae nephricae
- FMA: 17719 17705, 17719

Within the nephron of the kidney, the descending limb of loop of Henle is the portion of the renal tubule constituting the first part of the loop of Henle.

== Physiology ==
The permeability is as follows:

Substance	Permeability
ions	Low permeability. Sodium and chloride ions do not easily pass through.
urea	Moderate permeability.
water	Highly permeable. Water is readily reabsorbed from the descending limb by osmosis.

Also, the medullary interstitium is highly concentrated (because of the activity of the ascending limb), leading to a strong osmotic gradient from the descending limb to the medulla.

Because of these factors, the concentration of the urine increases dramatically in the descending limb. Osmolality can reach up to 1400 mOsmol/kg by the end of the descending limb.

== Histology ==
The epithelium in the thick segment of the descending limb consists of low simple cuboidal cells, which resemble those found in the proximal tubule. In contrast, the epithelium transitions to a simple squamous type in the thin segment, which is less metabolically active and has minimal surface specializations. The presence of aquaporin-1 channels in the thin segment facilitates high water permeability, crucial for water reabsorption as part of the kidney's countercurrent exchange mechanism.

They can be distinguished from the vasa recta by the absence of blood, and they can be distinguished from the thick ascending limb by the thickness of the epithelium.

== Nomenclature ==
Like the ascending limb, the descending limb has thick and thin portions. However, this distinction is not as important physiologically as in the ascending limb, so often the two are treated as one structure. The thick descending limb is less important than the thin descending limb, so often the terms "descending limb" and "thin descending limb" are used interchangeably.

Some sources simply refer to a "thin limb". In this context, the thin ascending limb of loop of Henle would be included.

== Additional images ==
Longitudinal section of descending limb of Henle's loop. a. Membrana propria. b. Epithelium.

== See also ==
- Ascending limb of loop of Henle
