= Loop diuretic =

Diuretics that act along the loop of Henle in the kidneys

- Drug class
- Structure of the loop diuretics Furosemide, Azosemide, Bumetanide, Piretanide, Torasemide, Ethacrynic acid and Etozolin

Class identifiers
- Synonyms: High ceiling diuretic
- Use: congestive heart failure, nephrotic syndrome, cirrhosis, hypertension, edema
- ATC code: C03C
- Biological target: Na-K-Cl cotransporter

External links
- MeSH: D049994

Legal status

Loop diuretics are drugs that are often used for the treatment of hypertension and edema secondary to congestive heart failure, liver cirrhosis, or chronic kidney disease. Their effect, like all diuretics, is to cause the body to excrete more water in the urine. Loop diuretics are more effective than thiazide diuretics in patients with impaired kidney function. They get their name because they affect cells in a structure in the kidney called the loop of Henle.

== Mechanism of action ==
Loop diuretics are 90% bonded to proteins and are secreted into the kidney's proximal convoluted tubule through organic anion transporter 1 (OAT-1), OAT-2, and ABCC4. Loop diuretics act on the Na^{+}-K^{+}-2Cl^{−} symporter (NKCC2) located on the luminal membrane of cells along the thick ascending limb of loop of Henle to inhibit sodium, chloride and potassium reabsorption. This is achieved by competing for the Cl^{−} binding site. Loop diuretics also inhibit NKCC2 at the macula densa, reducing sodium transported into macula densa cells. This stimulates the release of renin, which through renin–angiotensin system, increases fluid retention in the body, increases the perfusion of glomerulus, thus increasing glomerular filtration rate (GFR). At the same time, loop diuretics inhibit the tubuloglomerular feedback mechanism so that increase in salts at the lumen near macula densa does not trigger a response that reduces the GFR.

Loop diuretics also inhibit magnesium and calcium reabsorption in the thick ascending limb. Absorption of magnesium and calcium are dependent upon the positive voltage at the luminal side and less positive voltage at the interstitial side with transepithelial voltage gradient of 10 mV. This causes the magnesium and calcium ions to be repelled from luminal side to interstitial side, promoting their absorption. The difference in voltage in both sides is set up by potassium recycling through renal outer medullary potassium channel. By inhibiting the potassium recycling, the voltage gradient is abolished and magnesium and calcium reabsorption are inhibited. By disrupting the reabsorption of these ions, loop diuretics prevent the generation of a hypertonic renal medulla. Without such a concentrated medulla, water has less of an osmotic driving force to leave the collecting duct system, ultimately resulting in increased urine production. Loop diuretics cause a decrease in the renal blood flow by this mechanism. This diuresis leaves less water to be reabsorbed into the blood, resulting in a decrease in blood volume.

A secondary effect of loop diuretics is to increase the production of prostaglandins, which results in vasodilation and increased blood supply to the kidney. Prostaglandin-mediated vasodilation of preglomerular afferent arterioles increases the glomerular filtration rate (GFR) and facilitates diuresis. The collective effects of decreased blood volume and vasodilation help decrease blood pressure and ameliorate edema.

== Pharmacokinetics ==
Loop diuretics are highly protein bound and therefore have a low volume of distribution. The protein bound nature of the loop diuretic molecules causes it to be secreted via several transporter molecules along the luminal wall of the proximal convoluted tubules to be able to exert its function.

Loop diuretics usually have a ceiling effect whereby doses greater than a certain maximum amount will not increase the clinical effect of the drug. Also, there is a threshold minimum concentration of loop diuretics that needs to be achieved at the thick ascending limb to enable the onset of abrupt diuresis.

The availability of furosemide is highly variable, ranging from 10% to 90%. The biological half-life of furosemide is limited by absorption from the gastrointestinal tract into the bloodstream. The apparent half-life of its excretion is higher than the apparent half-life of absorption via the oral route. Therefore, furosemide taken intravenously is twice as potent as an equivalent dose taken orally.

However, for torsemide and bumetanide, their oral bioavailability is consistently higher than 90%. Torsemide has a longer half life in heart failure patients (6 hours) than furosemide (2.7 hours). A 40 mg dose of furosemide is clinically equivalent to a 20 mg dose of torsemide and to a 1 mg dose of bumetanide.

== Clinical use ==
Loop diuretics are principally used in the following indications:

- Heart failure - Giving 2.5 times of previous oral dose twice daily for those with acute decompensated heart failure is a reasonable strategy. However, daily assessment of clinical response is needed to adjust the subsequent doses.
- Edema - Volume overload associated with liver cirrhosis, heart failure, or nephrotic syndrome
- Cerebral edema - intravenous furosemide can be combined with mannitol to initiate rapid diuresis. However, the optimum duration of such treatment remains unknown. Frequent fluid status monitoring is required to prevent intravascular volume depletion which leads to reduced cerebral perfusion. A bolus intravenous dose of 10 or 20 mg of furosemide can be administered and then followed by intravenous bolus of 2 or 3% hypertonic saline to increase the serum sodium level.
- Pulmonary edema - Slow intravenous bolus dose of 40 to 80 mg furosemide at 4 mg per minute is indicated for patients with fluid overload and pulmonary edema. Such dose can be repeated after 20 minutes. After the bolus, a continuous intravenous infusion can be given at 5 to 10 mg per hour. For those with underlying renal impairment or severe heart failure, up to 160 to 200 mg bolus dose can be given.
- Hypertension - A systematic review by the Cochrane Hypertension group assessing the anti-hypertensive effects of loop diuretics found only a modest reduction in blood pressure when compared to placebo. According to Joint National Committee (JNC-8) guidelines, the first line treatment of hypertension is thiazide diuretics. The use of loop diuretics is not mentioned in this guideline. Meanwhile, according to 2013 European Society of Cardiology (ESC) guidelines, a loop diuretic can only replace thiazide-type diuretics if there is renal impairment (Creatinine of more than 1.5 mg/dL or estimated glomerular filtration rate (eGFR) of less 30 mL/min/1.73 m^{2} due to lack of long term cardiovascular outcome data and appropriate dosing regimen of its use.

The 2012 KDIGO (Kidney Disease: Improving Global Outcomes) guidelines stated that diuretics should not be used to treat acute kidney injury, except for the management of volume overload. Diuretics has not shown any benefits of preventing or treating acute kidney injury.

They are also sometimes used in the management of severe hypercalcemia in combination with adequate rehydration.

== Resistance ==
Diuretic resistance is defined as failure of diuretics to reduce fluid retention (can be measured by low urinary sodium) despite using the maximal dose of drugs. There are various causes for the resistance towards loop diuretics. After initial period of diuresis, there will be a period of "post-diuretic sodium retention" where the rate of sodium excretion does not reach as much as the initial diuresis period. Increased intake of sodium during this period will offset the amount of excreted sodium, and thus causing diuretic resistance. Prolonged usage of loop diuretics will also contributes to resistance through "braking phenomenon". This is the body physiological response to reduced extracellular fluid volume, where renin-angiotensin-aldosterone system will be activated which results in nephron remodelling. Nephron remodeling increases the number of distal convoluted cells, principle cells, and intercalated cells. These cells have sodium-chloride symporter at distal convoluted tubule, epithelial sodium channels, and chloride-bicarbonate exchanger pendrin. This will promote sodium reabsorption and fluid retention, causing diuretic resistance. Other factors includes gut edema which slows down the absorption of oral loop diuretics. Chronic kidney disease (CKD) reduces renal flow rate, reducing the delivery of diuretic molecules into the nephron, limiting sodium excretion and increasing sodium retention, causing diuretic resistance. Non-steroidal anti-inflammatory drug (NSAID) can compete with loop diuretics for organic ion transporters, thus preventing the diuretic molecules from being secreted into the proximal convoluted tubules.

Those with diuretic resistance, cardiorenal syndrome, and severe right ventricular dysfunction may have better response to continuous diuretic infusion. Diuretic dosages is adjusted to produce 3 to 5 litres of urine per day. Thiazide (blockade of sodium-chloride symporter), amiloride (blockade of epithelial sodium channels) and carbonic anhydrase inhibitors (blockade of chloride-bicarbonate exchanger pendrin) has been suggested to complement the action of loop diuretics in resistance cases but limited evidence are available to support their use.

== Adverse effects ==
The most common adverse drug reactions (ADRs) are dose-related and arise from the effect of loop diuretics on diuresis and electrolyte balance.

Common ADRs include: hyponatremia, hypokalemia, hypomagnesemia, dehydration, hyperuricemia, gout, dizziness, postural hypotension, syncope. The loss of magnesium as a result of loop diuretics has also been suggested as a possible cause of pseudogout (chondrocalcinosis).

Infrequent ADRs include: dyslipidemia, increased serum creatinine concentration, hypocalcemia, rash. Metabolic alkalosis may also be seen with loop diuretic use.

Ototoxicity (damage to the inner ear) is a serious, but rare ADR associated with use of loop diuretics. This may be limited to tinnitus and vertigo, but may result in deafness in serious cases.

Loop diuretics may also precipitate kidney failure in patients concurrently taking an NSAID and an ACE inhibitor—the so-called "triple whammy" effect.

Because furosemide, torsemide and bumetanide are technically sulfa drugs, there is a theoretical risk that patients sensitive to sulfonamides may be sensitive to these loop diuretics. This risk is stated on drug packaging inserts. However, the actual risk of crossreactivity is largely unknown and there are some sources that dispute the existence of such cross reactivity. In one study it was found that only 10% of patients with allergy to antibiotic sulfonamides were also allergic to diuretic sulfonamides, but it is unclear if this represents true cross reactivity or the nature of being prone to allergy.

Ethacrynic acid is the only medication of this class that is not a sulfonamide. It carries a greater risk of reversible or permanent hearing loss (ototoxicity), and has a distinct complication of being associated with gastrointestinal toxicity.

== Examples ==
- Furosemide
- Bumetanide
- Ethacrynic acid
- Torasemide

Loop Diuretic	Relative Potency
Furosemide	40 mg
Torasemide	20 mg
Ethacrynic Acid	50 mg
Bumetanide	1 mg
