= Stria vascularis of cochlear duct =

Capillary in the outer wall of the cochlear duct

- Cross section of the cochlea.

Details
- System: Cochlea

Identifiers
- Latin: stria vascularis ductus cochlearis
- MeSH: D013316
- NeuroLex ID: birnlex_2525
- TA98: A15.3.03.096
- TA2: 7028
- FMA: 77832

The stria vascularis of the cochlear duct is a capillary loop in the upper portion of the spiral ligament (the outer wall of the cochlear duct or scala media). It produces endolymph for the scala media in the cochlea.

== Structure ==
The stria vascularis is part of the lateral wall of the cochlear duct. It is a somewhat stratified epithelium containing primarily three cell types:

- marginal cells, which are involved in K^{+} transport, and line the endolymphatic space of the scala media.
- intermediate cells, which are pigment-containing cells scattered among capillaries.
- basal cells, which separate the stria vascularis from the underlying spiral ligament. They are connected to basal cells with gap junctions.

The stria vascularis also contains pericytes, melanocytes, and endothelial cells. It also contains intraepithelial capillaries - it is the only epithelial tissue that is not avascular (completely lacking blood vessels and lymphatic vessels).

== Function ==
The stria vascularis produces endolymph for the scala media, one of the three fluid-filled compartments of the cochlea. This maintains the ion balance of the endolymph that surround inner hair cells and outer hair cells of the organ of Corti. It secretes lots of K^{+}, and may also secrete H^{+}.
