= Ascending limb of loop of Henle =

Anatomical structure of the kidney

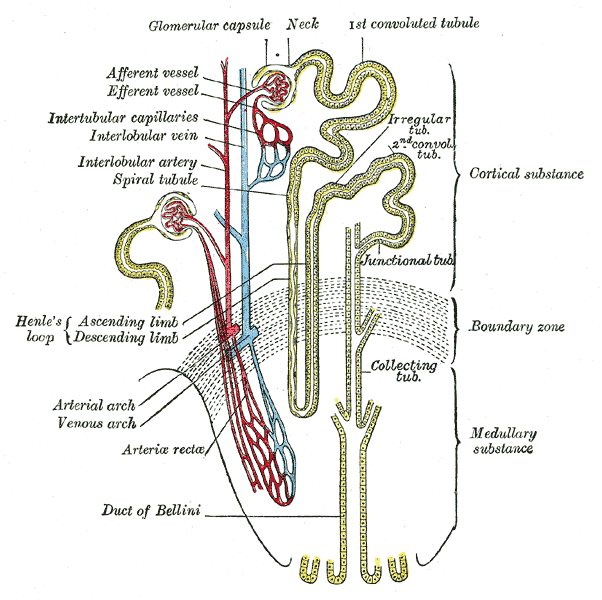
- Scheme of renal tubule and its vascular supply. (Labeled at center left.)

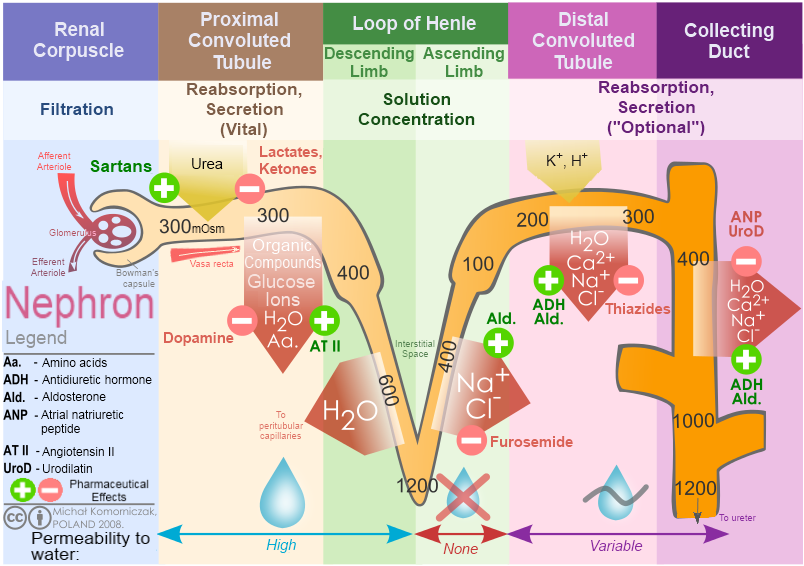
- Nephron ion flow diagram

Details

Identifiers
- Latin: tubulus rectus distalis, pars recta tubuli distalis
- FMA: 17717

Within the nephron of the kidney, the ascending limb of the loop of Henle is a segment of the heterogenous loop of Henle downstream of the descending limb, after the sharp bend of the loop. This part of the renal tubule is divided into a thin and thick ascending limb; the thick portion is also known as the distal straight tubule, in contrast with the distal convoluted tubule downstream.

== Structure ==
The ascending limb of the loop of Henle is a direct continuation from the descending limb of loop of Henle, and one of the structures in the nephron of the kidney. The ascending limb has a thin and a thick segment. The ascending limb drains urine into the distal convoluted tubule.

The thin ascending limb is found in the medulla of the kidney, and the thick ascending limb can be divided into a part that is in the renal medulla and a part that is in the renal cortex. The ascending limb is much thicker than the descending limb.

At the junction of the thick ascending limb and the distal convoluted tubule are a subset of 15–25 cells known as the macula densa that are part of renal autoregulation through the mechanism of tubuloglomerular feedback.

=== Histology ===
As in the descending limb, the epithelium is simple cuboidal epithelium.

== Function ==
=== Thin ascending limb ===
The thin ascending limb is impermeable to water; but is permeable to ions allowing for some sodium reabsorption. Na/K-ATPase is expressed at very low levels in this segment and thus this reabsorption is likely through passive diffusion. Salt moves out of the tubule and into the interstitium due to osmotic pressure created by the countercurrent system.

=== Thick ascending limb ===
Functionally, the parts of the ascending limb in the medulla and cortex are very similar.

The medullary ascending limb is largely impermeable to water. Sodium (Na^{+}), potassium (K^{+}) and chloride (Cl^{−}) ions are reabsorbed by active transport. The predominant mechanism of active transport in this segment is through the Na^{+}/K^{+}/Cl^{−} co-transporter NKCC2 as well as the sodium/hydrogen exchanger NHE3. In total this segment accounts for approximately 25–30% of total Na^{+} reabsorption along the nephron. This is of clinical importance since commonly used "loop diuretics" act by inhibiting the NKCC2. This active transport enables the kidney to establish an osmotic gradient that is essential to the kidneys ability to concentrate the urine past isotonicity.

K^{+} is passively transported along its concentration gradient through a K^{+} leak channel in the apical aspect of the cells, back into the lumen of the ascending limb. This K^{+} "leak" generates a positive electrochemical potential difference in the lumen. This drives more paracellular reabsorption of Na^{+}, as well as other cations such as magnesium (Mg^{2+}) and importantly calcium Ca^{2+} due to charge repulsion.

This is also the part of the tubule that generates Tamm–Horsfall protein. The function of this protein is not well understood, but is responsible for creating urinary casts.

== Clinical significance ==
The thick ascending limb symporter: Na-K-Cl cotransporter.

== See also ==
- Descending limb of loop of Henle
