= Renal urea handling =

Movement of urea in kidney physiology

Renal urea handling is the part of renal physiology that deals with the reabsorption and secretion of urea. Movement of large amounts of urea across cell membranes is made possible by urea transporter proteins.

Urea allows the kidneys to create hyperosmotic urine (urine that has more ions in it - is "more concentrated" - than that same person's blood plasma). Preventing the loss of water in this manner is important if the person's body must save water in order to maintain a suitable blood pressure or (more likely) in order to maintain a suitable concentration of sodium ions in the blood plasma.

About 40% of the urea filtered is normally found in the final urine, since there is more reabsorption than secretion along the nephron.

It is regulated by antidiuretic hormone, which controls the amount reabsorbed in the collecting duct system and secreted into the loop of Henle.

== Overview table ==
Characteristic	Proximal tubule			Loop of Henle			Distal convoluted tubule	Collecting duct system			
Characteristic	S1	S2	S3	descending limb	thin ascending limb	thick ascending limb	Distal convoluted tubule	connecting tubule	initial collecting tubule	cortical collecting ducts	medullary collecting ducts
reabsorption (% compared to filtered amount)	50										50
secretion (% compared to filtered amount)						50					
reabsorption (mmoles/day)											
concentration											
electrical driving force (mV)	-3		+3			+15	-5 to +5			-40	
chemical driving force (mV)											
electrochemical driving force (mV)											
apical transport proteins	solvent drag; unknown transporter			urea transporter 2?	unknown transporter						urea transporter 1
basolateral transport proteins	unknown transporter			urea transporter 2?	unknown transporter						urea transporter 4
other reabsorption features											
