= Osmoregulation in rock doves =

Regulation of water uptake and loss in pigeons

The rock dove, Columba livia, has a number of special adaptations for regulating water uptake and loss. Due to the pigeon's diet, it regulates water balance through osmoregulation. Unlike some other bird species, rock doves do this with their kidneys instead of the salt gland.

== Challenges ==
C. livia hydrate by intaking water from a water source or by ingesting food containing water. They drink water through a mechanism known as double-suction. The daily diet of the pigeon brings many physiological challenges which must be overcome through osmoregulation; protein intake causes excess toxins of amine groups when it is broken down for energy. To regulate this excess and secrete the unwanted toxins, the amine groups must be removed as uric acid. Nitrogen excretion through uric acid can be considered an advantage because it does not require much water, but producing it takes more energy because of its complex molecular composition.

Pigeons adjust their drinking rates and food intake in parallel; when adequate water is unavailable for excretion, food intake is limited to maintain water balance. Since this species inhabits arid environments, research attributes this to their strong flying capabilities to reach available water sources (not because of exceptional potential for water conservation). C. livia kidneys, like mammalian kidneys, are capable of producing urine hyperosmotic to the plasma using filtration, reabsorption, and secretion. The medullary cones function as countercurrent units which produce hyperosmotic urine. Hyperosmotic urine can be understood in terms of diffusion and osmolarity.

== Kidney function ==
Unlike a number of other bird species which have a salt gland as the primary osmoregulatory organ, C. livia does not use its salt gland. It uses the kidneys to maintain homeostatic balance of ions such as sodium and potassium while preserving water in the body. Filtration of the blood, reabsorption of ions and water, and secretion of uric acid are components of the kidney process. Columba livia has two kidneys which are coupled; each has three partially-separate lobes, and the posterior lobe is the largest. Like mammalian kidneys, the avian kidney contains medullary and cortical regions. Peripherally located around the cortical region, the collecting ducts gather into cone-like ducts (medullary cones) which converge into the ureters. There are two types of nephrons in the kidney; nephrons in the cortex without the loop of Henle are known as loopless, and the other type is known as looped (or mammalian). Looped nephrons contain the loop of Henle, which continues down into the medulla and enters the distal tubule to drain towards the ureter. Mammals generally have more-vascularised glomeruli than the nephrons in birds. Avian nephrons cannot produce urine which is hyperosmotic to the blood, but the loop of Henle uses countercurrent multiplication to become hyperosmotic in the collecting duct. This alternation of permeability between sections of the ascending and descending loop allows for urine osmotic pressure to be 2.5 times higher than blood osmotic pressure.

== Cell types involved in osmoregulation ==
The integumentary system functions in osmoregulation by acting as a barrier between the extracellular compartment and the environment to regulate water gain (and loss) and solute flux. The permeability of the integument to water and solutes varies from animal to animal. The excretory system is responsible for regulating water and solute levels in body fluids. Pigeons can produce hyperosmotic urine, but their renal system differs from that of other animals. They do not produce concentrated urine to reduce water loss, but produce a whitish urate: solid crystals of uric acid which are less toxic than urea. Waste moves from the blood in the peritubular capillaries, passes through the tubule cells and into the collecting duct system; it is transported as urate to the cloaca and from there to the large intestine, where uric-acid particles and water and solutes in the urine can be reabsorbed and balanced. This allows rock doves to conserve body water instead of excreting a large volume of dilute urea. Cells of the proximal tubule have microvilli and mitochondria which provide surface area and energy.

Blood pH is regulated by the A and B types of cells in the distal convoluted tubule and collecting duct. A-type cells are acid-secreting cells with a proton ATPase in the apical membrane and a Cl-/HCO_{3}-exchange system in the basolateral membrane; B-type cells are base-secreting cells, which secrete bicarbonate into the lumen of the tubule in exchange for chloride ions. Blood pH determines whether bicarbonate is reabsorbed or secreted.

== Transport mechanisms ==
The filtrate contains a number of important substances. In the proximal tubules of the C. livia kidney, necessary substances such as vitamins and glucose are reabsorbed into the blood. The kidney has a variety of ion channels involved in salt and water transport. Water is reabsorbed through aquaporins in the lumen of the proximal tubule, basolateral membrane, and blood vessels near the proximal tubule. Water flows from epithelial cells into the blood via osmosis, and the osmolarity of the filtrate remains isotonic. The ATPase, Na+/K+ transporting, alpha 1 enzyme, in the basolateral membrane of the epithelial cell (opposite the lumen of the proximal tubule), pumps sodium out of the cell into the blood.

== Eggshell gas exchange and water loss ==
Gas exchange across eggshells results in water loss from the egg, which must retain enough water to hydrate the embryo. Changing temperatures and humidity can affect the eggshell's architecture. Behavioral adaptations in Columba livia and other birds, such as the incubation of their eggs, can mitigate the effects of these changing environments. It was found that eggshell architecture undergoes selection decoupled from behavioural effects, and humidity may be a driving selective pressure. Low humidity requires enough water to keep the embryo from desiccating, and high humidity needs enough water loss to facilitate the initiation of pulmonary respiration. Water loss from the eggshell is directly linked to the species' growth rate. The ability of the embryo to tolerate extreme water loss is due to parental behaviour in species colonising in different environments. Studies indicate that wild habitats of C. livia and other birds have a higher tolerance of varied humidity levels, but C. livia prefers areas whose humidity closely matches its native breeding conditions. The pore areas allow water to diffuse in and out of the shell, preventing harm to the embryo. A thinner eggshell can cause a decrease in pore length and an increase in conductance and pore area, and can decrease mechanical restriction of the embryo.
