= Renal oligopeptide reabsorption =

Movement of oligopeptides in kidney physiology

Renal oligopeptide reabsorption is the part of renal physiology that deals with the retrieval of filtered oligopeptides, preventing them from disappearing from the body through the urine.

Almost all reabsorption takes place in the proximal tubule. Practically nothing is left in the final urine. Longer oligopeptides, such as angiotensin and glutathione are degraded by enzymes on the brush border, while shorter ones, such as carnosine, are transported across the apical membrane as a whole by the PepT 1 transporter, and degraded inside the proximal tubule cell.

== Overview table ==
Characteristics of oligopeptide reabsorption
Characteristic	proximal tubule			loop of Henle	Distal convoluted tubule	Collecting duct system
Characteristic	S1	S2	S3	loop of Henle	Distal convoluted tubule	Collecting duct system
reabsorption (%)	99			Beyond the proximal tubule: 1%		
reabsorption (mmoles/day)						
Concentration						
apical transport proteins	sodium-amino acid symporter; PepT 1 (for short peptides, n=2 to 4)					
basolateral transport proteins	amino acid transporter					
Other reabsorption features						
