= Renal chloride reabsorption =

Reabsorption of filtered chloride ions within the kidneys

In renal physiology, renal chloride reabsorption refers to the process by which the kidneys, having filtered out waste products from the blood to be excreted as urine, re-absorb chloride ions (Cl^{−}) from the waste.

== Overview table ==
Characteristics of Cl^{−} reabsorption
Characteristic	Proximal tubule			Loop of Henle			Distal convoluted tubule	Collecting duct system			
Characteristic	S1	S2	S3	descending limb	thin ascending limb	thick ascending limb	Distal convoluted tubule	connecting tubule	initial collecting tubule	cortical collecting ducts	medullary collecting ducts
reabsorption (%)											
reabsorption (mmoles/day)											
concentration (mM)	115		135								
electrical driving force (mV)	−3		+3			+15	−5 to +5			−40	
chemical driving force (mV)											
electrochemical driving force (mV)	(positive)										
apical transport proteins	(passively)		Cl-formate exchanger; Cl-oxalate exchanger; Cl^{−}-OH^{−} exchanger			Na-K-2Cl cotransporter	Na-Cl cotransporter			principal cells: paracellularily	
basolateral transport proteins			chloride channels; Cl-K cotransporter; Cl^{−}/HCO_{3}^{−} exchanger			chloride channels	chloride channels			chloride channels β intercalated cells: Cl^{−}HCO_{3}^{−} exchanger	
other reabsorption features											
