= Solvent drag =

Transport effect in physiology

Solvent drag, also known as bulk transport, refers to solutes in the ultrafiltrate that are transported back from the renal tubule by the flow of water rather than specifically by ion pumps or other membrane transport proteins. This is a phenomenon primarily in renal physiology, but it also occurs in gastrointestinal physiology.

It generally occurs in the paracellular, rather than transcellular, pathway between the tubular cells.

It is seen e.g. in the passive transport in renal sodium reabsorption, renal chloride reabsorption as well as renal urea handling.
