= Renal protein reabsorption =

Renal protein reabsorption is the part of renal physiology that deals with the retrieval of filtered proteins, preventing them from disappearing from the body through the urine.

Almost all reabsorption takes place in the proximal tubule. Only ~1% is left in the final urine.

The proteins cross the apical membrane by endocytosis. They are subsequently degraded in lysosomes. The remaining free amino acids are transported across the basolateral membrane by amino acid transporters.

== Overview table ==
Characteristics of oligopeptide reabsorption
Characteristic	proximal tubule			loop of Henle	Distal convoluted tubule	Collecting duct system
Characteristic	S1	S2	S3	loop of Henle	Distal convoluted tubule	Collecting duct system
reabsorption (%)	99					
reabsorption (mmoles/day)						
Concentration						
apical transport	endocytosis					
basolateral transport proteins	amino acid transporter					
Other reabsorption features						
