= Chloride hydroxyl exchanger =

Type of membrane transport protein

A chloride hydroxyl exchanger is a purported membrane transport protein responsible for the exchange of chloride and hydroxyl in the renal proximal tubule, functioning in renal chloride reabsorption. However, little is known about the protein responsible for this action.
