= C7H9N2O =

The molecular formula C_{7}H_{9}N_{2}O (molar mass: 137.16 g/mol) may refer to:

- 1-Methylnicotinamide, a prototypic organic cation
- Pralidoxime, an oxime
