= NAE =

NAE may refer to:

- National Academy of Engineering, US
- National Association of Evangelicals, a U.S. religious fellowship
- Net acid excretion, the net amount of acid excreted in the urine per unit time
- NEDD8 activating enzyme
- North American English, a generalized variety of the English language

== See also ==
- Nae
- Nae Nae, dance
  - Watch Me (Whip/Nae Nae), a 2015 song by Silento named after the dance
