= Carboxylate transporter =

Membrane transport protein

A carboxylate transporter is a membrane transport protein that transports carboxylate.

They are responsible for the reabsorption of filtered carboxylate in renal physiology, resulting in a 100% reabsorption in the proximal tubule.

== In proximal tubule ==
In the renal proximal tubule, there are several kinds of carboxylate transporters in the apical membrane and the basolateral membrane.

=== Apical ===
- Na-monocarboxylate cotransporter
- 3Na-dicarboxylate cotransporter
- 3Na-tricarboxylate cotransporter

=== Basolateral ===
- H-monocarboxylate cotransporter
- organic anion-dicarboxylate exchanger
