= Renal physiology =

Study of the physiology of the kidney

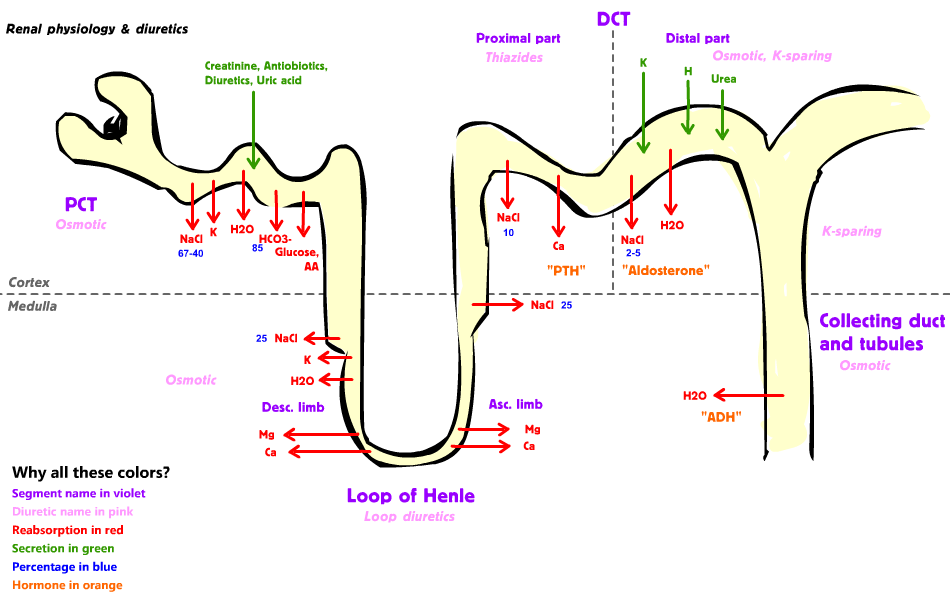
This illustration demonstrates the normal kidney physiology, including the Proximal Convoluted Tubule (PCT), Loop of Henle, and Distal Convoluted Tubule (DCT). It also includes illustrations showing where some types of diuretics act, and what they do.

Renal physiology (Latin renes, "kidneys") is the study of the physiology of the kidney. This encompasses all functions of the kidney, including maintenance of acid-base balance; regulation of fluid balance; regulation of sodium, potassium, and other electrolytes; clearance of toxins; absorption of glucose, amino acids, and other small molecules; regulation of blood pressure; production of various hormones, such as erythropoietin; and activation of vitamin D.

Much of renal physiology is studied at the level of the nephron, the smallest functional unit of the kidney. Each nephron begins with a filtration component that filters the blood entering the kidney. This filtrate then flows along the length of the nephron, which is a tubular structure lined by a single layer of specialized cells and surrounded by capillaries. The major functions of these lining cells are the reabsorption of water and small molecules from the filtrate into the blood, and the secretion of wastes from the blood into the urine.

Proper function of the kidney requires that it receives and adequately filters blood. This is performed at the microscopic level by many hundreds of thousands of filtration units called renal corpuscles, each of which is composed of a glomerulus and a Bowman's capsule. A global assessment of renal function is often ascertained by estimating the rate of filtration, called the glomerular filtration rate (GFR).

== Formation of urine ==
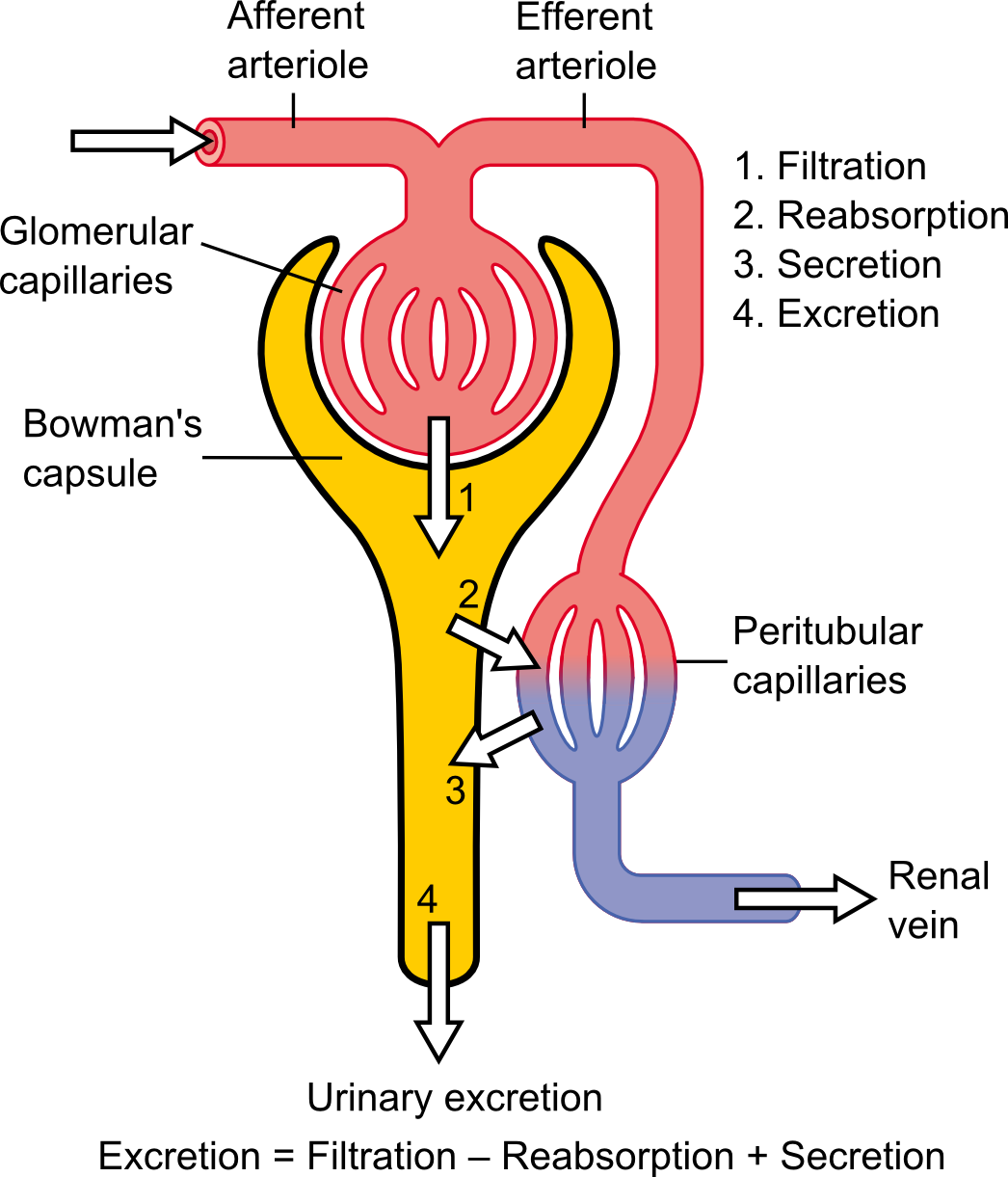
Diagram showing the basic physiologic mechanisms of the kidney

The kidney's ability to perform many of its functions depends on the three fundamental functions of filtration, reabsorption, and secretion, whose sum is called renal clearance or renal excretion. That is:

Urinary excretion rate = Filtration rate – Reabsorption rate + Secretion rate

Although the strictest sense of the word excretion with respect to the urinary system is urination itself, renal clearance is also conventionally called excretion (for example, in the set term fractional excretion of sodium).

=== Filtration ===
The blood is filtered by nephrons, the functional units of the kidney. Each nephron begins in a renal corpuscle, which is composed of a glomerulus enclosed in a Bowman's capsule. Cells, proteins, and other large molecules are filtered out of the glomerulus by a process of ultrafiltration, leaving an ultrafiltrate that resembles plasma (except that the ultrafiltrate has negligible plasma proteins) to enter Bowman's space. Filtration is driven by Starling forces.

The ultrafiltrate is passed through, in turn, the proximal convoluted tubule, the loop of Henle, the distal convoluted tubule, and a series of collecting ducts to form urine.

=== Reabsorption ===
Tubular reabsorption is the process by which solutes and water are removed from the tubular fluid and transported into the blood. It is called reabsorption (and not absorption) both because these substances have already been absorbed once (particularly in the intestines) and because the body is reclaiming them from a postglomerular fluid stream that is well on its way to becoming urine (that is, they will soon be lost to the urine unless they are reclaimed).

Reabsorption is a two-step process beginning with the active or passive extraction of substances from the tubule fluid into the renal interstitium (the connective tissue that surrounds the nephrons), and then the transport of these substances from the interstitium into the bloodstream. These transport processes are driven by Starling forces, diffusion, and active transport.

==== Indirect reabsorption ====
In some cases, reabsorption is indirect. For example, bicarbonate (HCO_{3}^{−}) does not have a transporter, so its reabsorption involves a series of reactions in the tubule lumen and tubular epithelium. It begins with the active secretion of a hydrogen ion (H^{+}) into the tubule fluid via a Na/H exchanger:

- In the lumen
  - The H^{+} combines with HCO_{3}^{−} to form carbonic acid (H_{2}CO_{3})
  - Luminal carbonic anhydrase enzymatically converts H_{2}CO_{3} into H_{2}O and CO_{2}
  - CO_{2} freely diffuses into the cell
- In the epithelial cell
  - Cytoplasmic carbonic anhydrase converts the CO_{2} and H_{2}O (which is abundant in the cell) into H_{2}CO_{3}
  - H_{2}CO_{3} readily dissociates into H^{+} and HCO_{3}^{−}
  - HCO_{3}^{−} is facilitated out of the cell's basolateral membrane

==== Influence of hormones ====
Some key regulatory hormones for re-absorption include:

- aldosterone, which stimulates active sodium re-absorption (and water as a result)
- anti-diuretic hormone, which stimulates passive water re-absorption

Both hormones exert their effects principally on the collecting ducts.

Tubular secretion occurs simultaneously during re-absorption of filtrate. Substances, generally produced by body or the by-products of cell metabolism that can become toxic in high concentration, and some drugs (if taken). These all are secreted into the lumen of renal tubule. Tubular secretion can be either active or passive or co-transport. Substances mainly secreted into renal tubule are; H^{+}, K_{+}, NH_{3}, urea, creatinine, histamine and drugs like penicillin. Tubular secretion occurs at Proximal Convoluted Tubule (PCT) and Distal Convoluted Tubule (D.C.T); for example, at proximal convoluted tubule, potassium is secreted by means of sodium-potassium pump, hydrogen ion is secreted by means of active transport and co-transport, i.e. anti-porter, and ammonia diffuses into renal tubule.

== Other functions ==
=== Hormone secretion ===
The kidneys secrete a variety of hormones, including erythropoietin, calcitriol, and renin. Erythropoietin is released in response to hypoxia (low levels of oxygen at tissue level) in the renal circulation. It stimulates erythropoiesis (production of red blood cells) in the bone marrow. Calcitriol, the activated form of vitamin D, promotes intestinal absorption of calcium and the renal reabsorption of phosphate. Renin is an enzyme which regulates angiotensin and aldosterone levels.

=== Maintaining homeostasis ===
The kidney is responsible for maintaining a balance of the following substances:

| Substance | Description | Proximal tubule | Loop of Henle | Distal tubule | Collecting duct |
|---|---|---|---|---|---|
| Glucose | If glucose is not reabsorbed by the kidney, it appears in the urine, in a condition known as glycosuria. This is associated with diabetes mellitus. | reabsorption (almost 100%) via sodium-glucose transport proteins (apical) and GLUT (basolateral). | – | – | – |
| Oligopeptides, proteins, and amino acids | All are reabsorbed nearly completely. | reabsorption | – | – | – |
| Urea | Regulation of osmolality. Varies with ADH | reabsorption (50%) via passive transport | secretion | – | reabsorption in medullary collecting ducts |
| Sodium | Uses Na-H antiport, Na-glucose symport, sodium ion channels (minor) | reabsorption (65%, isosmotic) | reabsorption (25%, thick ascending, Na-K-2Cl symporter) | reabsorption (5%, sodium-chloride symporter) | reabsorption (5%, principal cells), stimulated by aldosterone via ENaC |
| Chloride | Usually follows sodium. Active (transcellular) and passive (paracellular) | reabsorption | reabsorption (thin ascending, thick ascending, Na-K-2Cl symporter) | reabsorption (sodium-chloride symporter) | – |
| Water | Uses aquaporin water channels. See also diuretic. | absorbed osmotically along with solutes | reabsorption (descending) | – | reabsorption (regulated by ADH, via arginine vasopressin receptor 2) |
| Bicarbonate | Helps maintain acid-base balance. | reabsorption (80–90%) | reabsorption (thick ascending) | – | reabsorption (intercalated cells, via band 3 and pendrin) |
| Protons | Uses vacuolar H+ATPase | – | – | – | secretion (intercalated cells) |
| Potassium | Varies upon dietary needs. | reabsorption (65%) | reabsorption (20%, thick ascending, Na-K-2Cl symporter) | – | secretion (common, via Na+/K+-ATPase, increased by aldosterone), or reabsorption (rare, hydrogen potassium ATPase) |
| Calcium | Uses calcium ATPase, sodium-calcium exchanger | reabsorption | reabsorption (thick ascending) via passive transport | reabsorption in response to PTH and ↑ reabsorption with Thiazide Diuretics. | – |
| Magnesium | Calcium and magnesium compete, and an excess of one can lead to excretion of the other. | reabsorption | reabsorption (thick ascending) | reabsorption | – |
| Phosphate | Excreted as titratable acid. | reabsorption (85%) via sodium/phosphate cotransporter. Inhibited by parathyroid hormone. | – | – | – |
| Carboxylate | | reabsorption (100%) via carboxylate transporters. | – | – | – |

The body is very sensitive to its pH. Outside the range of pH that is compatible with life, proteins are denatured and digested, enzymes lose their ability to function, and the body is unable to sustain itself. The kidneys maintain acid-base homeostasis by regulating the pH of the blood plasma. Gains and losses of acid and base must be balanced. Acids are divided into "volatile acids" and "nonvolatile acids". See also titratable acid.

The major homeostatic control point for maintaining this stable balance is renal excretion. The kidney is directed to excrete or retain sodium via the action of aldosterone, antidiuretic hormone (ADH, or vasopressin), atrial natriuretic peptide (ANP), and other hormones. Abnormal ranges of the fractional excretion of sodium can imply acute tubular necrosis or glomerular dysfunction.

==== Acid-base ====
Two organ systems, the kidneys and lungs, maintain acid-base homeostasis, which is the maintenance of pH around a relatively stable value. The lungs contribute to acid-base homeostasis by regulating carbon dioxide (CO_{2}) concentration. The kidneys have two very important roles in maintaining the acid-base balance: to reabsorb and regenerate bicarbonate from urine, and to excrete hydrogen ions and fixed acids (anions of acids) into urine.

==== Osmolality ====
The kidneys help maintain the water and salt level of the body. Any significant rise in plasma osmolality is detected by the hypothalamus, which communicates directly with the posterior pituitary gland. An increase in osmolality causes the gland to secrete antidiuretic hormone (ADH), resulting in water reabsorption by the kidney and an increase in urine concentration. The two factors work together to return the plasma osmolality to its normal levels.

ADH binds to principal cells in the collecting duct that translocate aquaporins to the membrane, allowing water to leave the normally impermeable membrane and be reabsorbed into the body by the vasa recta, thus increasing the plasma volume of the body.

There are two systems that create a hyperosmotic medulla and thus increase the body plasma volume: Urea recycling and the 'single effect.'

Urea is usually excreted as a waste product from the kidneys. However, when plasma blood volume is low and ADH is released the aquaporins that are opened are also permeable to urea. This allows urea to leave the collecting duct into the medulla, creating a hyperosmotic solution that "attracts" water. Urea can then re-enter the nephron and be excreted or recycled again depending on whether ADH is still present or not.

The 'single effect' describes the fact that the ascending thick limb of the loop of Henle is not permeable to water but is permeable to sodium chloride. This allows for a countercurrent exchange system whereby the medulla becomes increasingly concentrated, but at the same time setting up an osmotic gradient for water to follow should the aquaporins of the collecting duct be opened by ADH.

=== Blood pressure ===
Although the kidney cannot directly sense blood, long-term regulation of blood pressure predominantly depends upon the kidney. This primarily occurs through maintenance of the extracellular fluid compartment, the size of which depends on the plasma sodium concentration. Renin is the first in a series of important chemical messengers that make up the renin–angiotensin system. Changes in renin ultimately alter the output of this system, principally the hormones angiotensin II and aldosterone. Each hormone acts via multiple mechanisms, but both increase the kidney's absorption of sodium chloride, thereby expanding the extracellular fluid compartment and raising blood pressure. When renin levels are elevated, the concentrations of angiotensin II and aldosterone increase, leading to increased sodium chloride reabsorption, expansion of the extracellular fluid compartment, and an increase in blood pressure. Conversely, when renin levels are low, angiotensin II and aldosterone levels decrease, contracting the extracellular fluid compartment, and decreasing blood pressure.

=== Glucose formation ===
The kidney in humans is capable of producing glucose from lactate, glycerol and glutamine. The kidney is responsible for about half of the total gluconeogenesis in fasting humans. The regulation of glucose production in the kidney is achieved by action of insulin, catecholamines and other hormones. Renal gluconeogenesis takes place in the renal cortex. The renal medulla is incapable of producing glucose due to absence of necessary enzymes.

== Measurement of renal function ==
A simple means of estimating renal function is to measure pH, blood urea nitrogen, creatinine, and basic electrolytes (including sodium, potassium, chloride, and bicarbonate). As the kidney is the most important organ in controlling these values, any derangement in these values could suggest renal impairment.

There are several more formal tests and ratios involved in estimating renal function:

| Measurement | Calculation | Details |
|---|---|---|
| renal plasma flow | $\text{RPF} = \frac{\text{effective RPF}}{\text{extraction ratio}}$ | Volume of blood plasma delivered to the kidney per unit time. PAH clearance is a renal analysis method used to provide an estimate. Approximately 625 ml/min. |
| renal blood flow | $\text{RBF} = \frac\text{RPF}{1 - \text{HCT}}$ (HCT is hematocrit) | Volume of blood delivered to the kidney per unit time. In humans, the kidneys together receive roughly 20% of cardiac output, amounting to 1 L/min in a 70-kg adult male. |
| glomerular filtration rate | $\text{GFR} = \frac{U_{[\text{creatinine}]}\times \dot{V}}{P_{[\text{creatinine}]}}$ (estimation using creatinine clearance) | Volume of fluid filtered from the renal glomerular capillaries into the Bowman's capsule per unit time. Estimated using inulin. Usually a creatinine clearance test is performed but other markers, such as the plant polysaccharide inulin or radiolabelled EDTA, may be used as well. |
| filtration fraction | $\text{FF} = \frac\text{GFR}\text{RPF}$ | Measures portion of renal plasma that is filtered. |
| anion gap | AG = [Na^{+}] − ([Cl^{−}] + [HCO_{3}^{−}]) | Cations minus anions. Excludes K^{+} (usually), Ca^{2+}, H_{2}PO_{4}^{−}. Aids in the differential diagnosis of metabolic acidosis |
| Clearance (other than water) | $C = \frac{U \times \dot{V}}{P}$ where U = concentration, V = urine volume / time, $U\times V$ = urinary excretion, and P = plasma concentration | Rate of removal |
| free water clearance | $C = \dot{V} - C_{osm}$ or $\dot{V} - \frac{U_{osm}}{P_{osm}}\dot{V} =C_\ce{H2O}$ | The volume of blood plasma that is cleared of solute-free water per unit time. |
| Net acid excretion | $\ce{NEA} = \dot{V} ( U_\ce{NH4} + U_\ce{TA} - U_\ce{HCO3} )$ | Net amount of acid excreted in the urine per unit time |
