= OK cells =

OK cells (short for opossum kidney cells) are a marsupial cell line used in medical research to model proximal tubule epithelial cells of the kidney.

== Characteristics ==
The cell line was derived from the kidney of an adult female North American opossum (Didelphis virginiana). Like porcine LLC-PK1 cells, this cell line has the limitation of lacking several enzymes specific to the proximal tubule. Nonetheless, OK cells have been used extensively to study functional interactions between the parathyroid hormone 1 receptor (PTH1R) and the sodium-hydrogen exchange regulatory factor 1 (NHERF1).

== Use in research ==
OK cells were originally cultured as a source of X chromosomes for studies on X inactivation. They have also served as models for the study of renal dopaminergic physiology, owing to their capacity to produce and degrade dopamine. OK cells are sold under the catalog number CRL-1840 by ATCC.
