= Urea transporter =

Membrane transport protein

UT

Identifiers
- Symbol: UT
- Pfam: PF03253
- InterPro: IPR004937
- TCDB: 1.A.28
- OPM superfamily: 13
- OPM protein: 3k3f
Available protein structures:
- Pfam: structures / ECOD
- PDB: RCSB PDB; PDBe; PDBj
- PDBsum: structure summary

A urea transporter is a membrane transport protein, transporting urea. Humans and other mammals have two types of urea transport proteins, UT-A and UT-B. The UT-A proteins are important for renal urea handling and are produced by alternative splicing of the SLC14A2 gene. Urea transport in the kidney is regulated by vasopressin.

The structure of a urea transport family protein from Desulfovibrio vulgaris was determined by x-ray crystallography. The structure has a pathway through the membrane that is similar to that of ion channel proteins, accounting for the ability of urea transport proteins to move up to one million urea molecules per second across the membrane.

Urea transporters can be inhibited by the action of urea analogues like thiourea and glycosides like phloretin. Their inhibition results in increased diuresis due to urea induced osmosis in the collecting ducts of the kidney.

== Types ==
In mammals, there are two urea transporter genes: UT-A (SLC14A2) and UT-B (SLC14A1). Multiple protein isoforms derived from each gene are produced by alternative splicing and alternative promoters.

=== UT-A1 ===
Urea transporter A1 transports urea across the apical membrane into the intracellular space of luminal cells in the inner medullary collecting duct of the kidneys. UT-1 is activated by ADH, but is a passive transporter. It reabsorbs up to 70% of the original filtered load of urea.

=== UT-A2 ===
Urea Transporter 2 transports urea across the apical membrane into the luminal space of cells in the thin descending loop of Henle of the kidneys.

=== UT-A3 ===
Urea transporter 3 transports urea into the interstitium of the Inner Medullary Collecting Duct.

=== UT-A4 ===
Urea transporter 4 has been detected in rat but not mouse kidney medulla.

=== UT-A5 ===
Urea transporter 5 is not expressed in the kidney but in the testis.

=== UT-B ===
UT-B is widely expressed and has been studied in erythrocytes, kidney, intestine, and at the blood–brain barrier. The SLC14A1 gene codes for the UT-B protein. UT-B is expressed at the basolateral and apical regions of the descending Vasa recta.
