= Peptide transporter 1 =

Mammalian protein found in Homo sapiens

SLC15A1

Identifiers
- Aliases: SLC15A1, HPECT1, HPEPT1, PEPT1, Peptide transporter 1, solute carrier family 15 member 1
- External IDs: OMIM: 600544; MGI: 1861376; GeneCards: SLC15A1

Gene location (Human)
Chr.	Chromosome 13 (human)
Band	13q32.2-q32.3	Start	98,683,801 bp
Band	13q32.2-q32.3	End	98,752,672 bp

Gene location (Mouse)
Chr.	Chromosome 14 (mouse)
Band	14|14 E5	Start	121,697,033 bp
Band	14|14 E5	End	121,742,664 bp
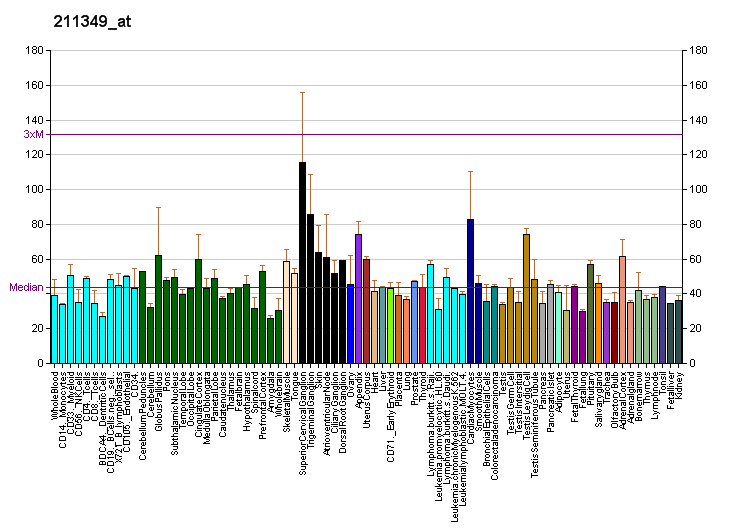

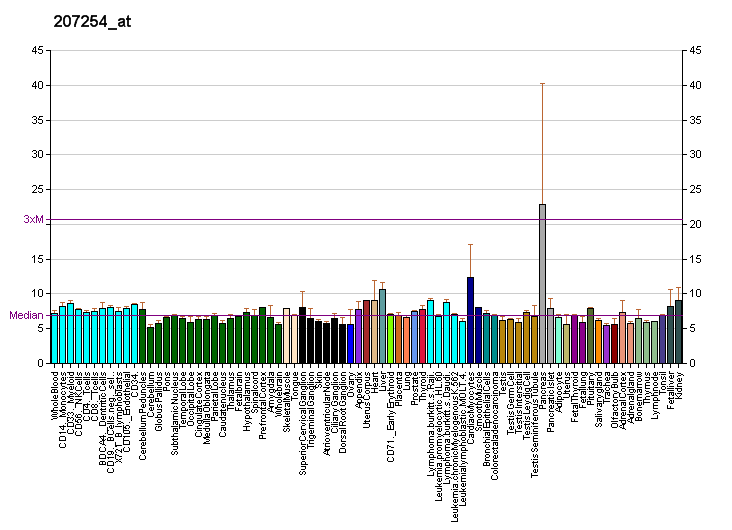
RNA expression pattern
Bgee	Human / Mouse (ortholog); Top expressed in: duodenum; jejunal mucosa; mucosa of ileum; gallbladder; vulva; skin of abdomen; skin of arm; skin of thigh; right lobe of liver; human penis / Top expressed in: epithelium of small intestine; intestinal villus; jejunum; left colon; duodenum; ileum; esophagus; lip; skin of external ear; skin of back; More reference expression data
BioGPS	More reference expression data
Gene ontology
Molecular function	proton-dependent oligopeptide secondary active transmembrane transporter activity; symporter activity; transporter activity; transmembrane transporter activity; oligopeptide transmembrane transporter activity; peptide:proton symporter activity; dipeptide transmembrane transporter activity; peptide transmembrane transporter activity
Cellular component	integral component of membrane; plasma membrane; brush border; membrane; integral component of plasma membrane
Biological process	protein transport; peptide transport; oligopeptide transport; oligopeptide transmembrane transport; ion transport; transmembrane transport; proton transmembrane transport; dipeptide transmembrane transport
Sources:Amigo / QuickGO
Orthologs
Databases	NCBI: entry; OMA: entry
Species	Human	Mouse
Entrez	6564	56643
Ensembl	ENSG00000088386	ENSMUSG00000025557
UniProt	P46059	Q9JIP7
RefSeq (mRNA)	NM_005073	NM_053079
RefSeq (protein)	NP_005064	NP_444309
Location (UCSC)	Chr 13: 98.68 – 98.75 Mb	Chr 14: 121.7 – 121.74 Mb
PubMed search
- Wikidata
View/Edit Human	View/Edit Mouse

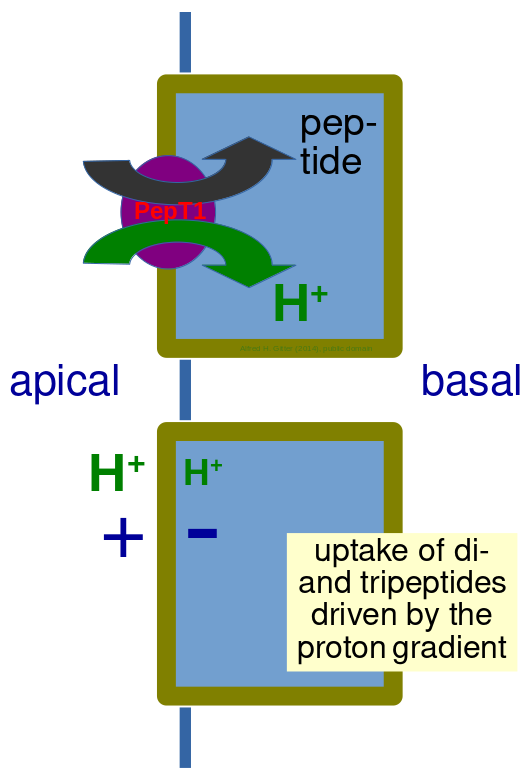
PepT 1 is a proton-coupled peptide cotransporter in epithelial cells.

Peptide transporter 1 (PepT 1) also known as solute carrier family 15 member 1 (SLC15A1) is a protein that in humans is encoded by SLC15A1 gene. PepT 1 is a solute carrier for oligopeptides. It functions in renal oligopeptide reabsorption and in the intestines in a proton dependent way, hence acting like a cotransporter.

== Function ==
SLC15A1is localized to the brush border membrane of the intestinal epithelium and mediates the uptake of di- and tripeptides from the lumen into the enterocytes. This protein plays an important role in the uptake and digestion of dietary proteins. This protein also facilitates the absorption of numerous peptidomimetic drugs. Peptide transporter 1 functions in nutrient and drug transport have been studied using intestinal organoids.

== See also ==
- Solute carrier family
