= Urea transporter 2 =

Protein-coding gene in the species Homo sapiens

SLC14A2

Identifiers
- Aliases: SLC14A2, HUT2, UT-A2, UT2, UTA, UTR, hUT-A6, solute carrier family 14 member 2
- External IDs: OMIM: 601611; MGI: 1351653; GeneCards: SLC14A2

Gene location (Human)
Chr.	Chromosome 18 (human)
Band	18q12.3	Start	45,212,995 bp
Band	18q12.3	End	45,683,688 bp

Gene location (Mouse)
Chr.	Chromosome 18 (mouse)
Band	18|18 E3	Start	78,189,363 bp
Band	18|18 E3	End	78,640,157 bp
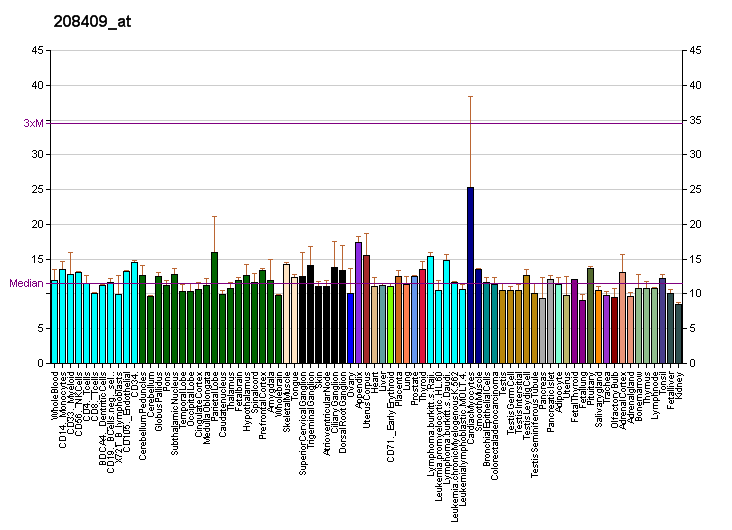

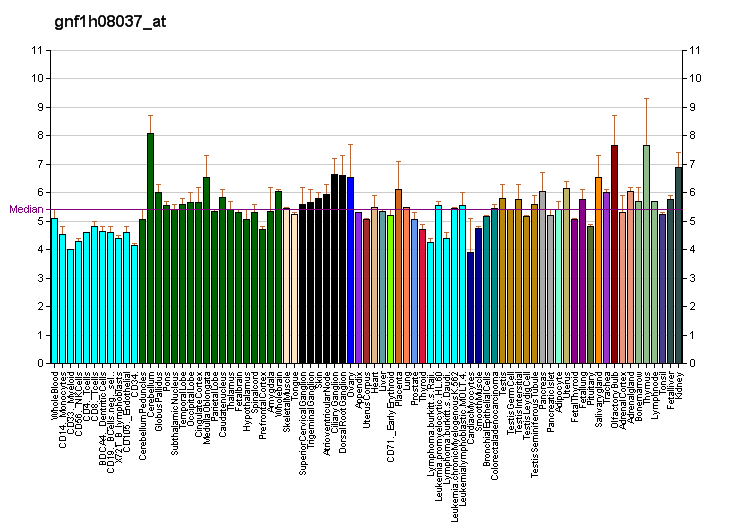
RNA expression pattern
Bgee	Human / Mouse (ortholog); Top expressed in: gonad; right adrenal gland; right adrenal cortex; left adrenal gland; left adrenal cortex; Achilles tendon; ventricular zone; tibial arteries; human kidney; appendix / Top expressed in: inner renal medulla; right kidney; respiratory epithelium; olfactory epithelium; thin ascending limb of loop of Henle; human kidney; inner stripe of outer renal medulla; seminiferous tubule; ventricular zone; embryo; More reference expression data
BioGPS	More reference expression data
Gene ontology
Molecular function	urea transmembrane transporter activity; cell adhesion molecule binding; protein binding; urea channel activity
Cellular component	apical plasma membrane; plasma membrane; membrane; integral component of membrane; integral component of plasma membrane
Biological process	urea transmembrane transport; transmembrane transport; urea transport
Sources:Amigo / QuickGO
Orthologs
Databases	NCBI: entry; OMA: entry
Species	Human	Mouse
Entrez	8170	27411
Ensembl	ENSG00000132874	ENSMUSG00000024552
UniProt	Q15849	Q8R4T9
RefSeq (mRNA)	NM_001242692; NM_007163; NM_001371319	NM_001110273; NM_001110274; NM_030683; NM_207651
RefSeq (protein)	NP_001229621; NP_009094; NP_001358248	NP_001103743; NP_001103744; NP_109608; NP_997534
Location (UCSC)	Chr 18: 45.21 – 45.68 Mb	Chr 18: 78.19 – 78.64 Mb
PubMed search
- Wikidata
View/Edit Human	View/Edit Mouse

Urea transporter 2 is a protein that in humans is encoded by the SLC14A2 gene.

== Function ==
In mammalian cells, urea is the chief end-product of nitrogen catabolism and plays an important role in the urinary concentration mechanism. Thus, the plasma membrane of erythrocytes and some renal epithelial cells exhibit an elevated urea permeability that is mediated by highly selective urea transporters. In mammals, two urea transporters have been identified: the renal tubular urea transporter, UT2 (UT-A), and the erythrocyte urea transporter, UT11 (also called UT-B, coded for by the SLC14A1 gene). SLC14A2 and SLC14A1 constitute solute carrier family 14.
