= NNMT =

Protein-coding gene in humans

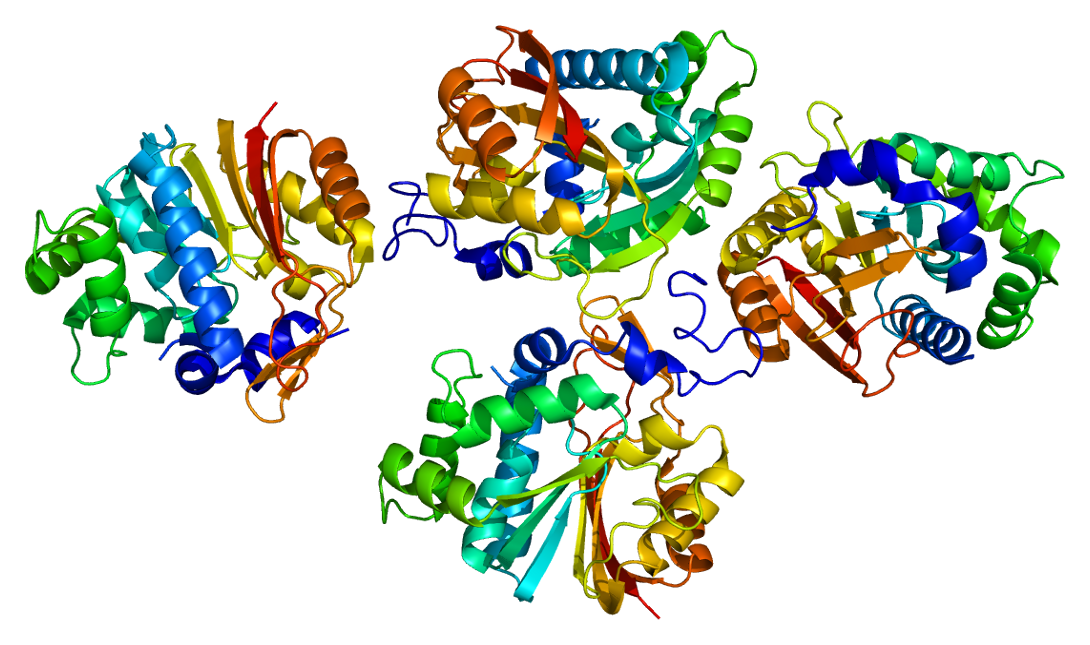

Identifiers
- Aliases: NNMT, Nnmt, nicotinamide N-methyltransferase
- External IDs: OMIM: 600008; MGI: 1099443; GeneCards: NNMT
Available structures
PDB	Ortholog search: PDBe RCSB
PDB	List of PDB id codes 3ROD, 2IIP
Enzyme activity
EC #	BRENDA	ExPASy	KEGG	MetaCyc
2.1.1.1	↗	↗	↗	↗

Gene location (Human)
Chr.	Chromosome 11 (human)
Band	11q23.2	Start	114,257,787 bp
Band	11q23.2	End	114,313,285 bp

Gene location (Mouse)
Chr.	Chromosome 9 (mouse)
Band	9 A5.3|9 26.45 cM	Start	48,503,177 bp
Band	9 A5.3|9 26.45 cM	End	48,516,453 bp
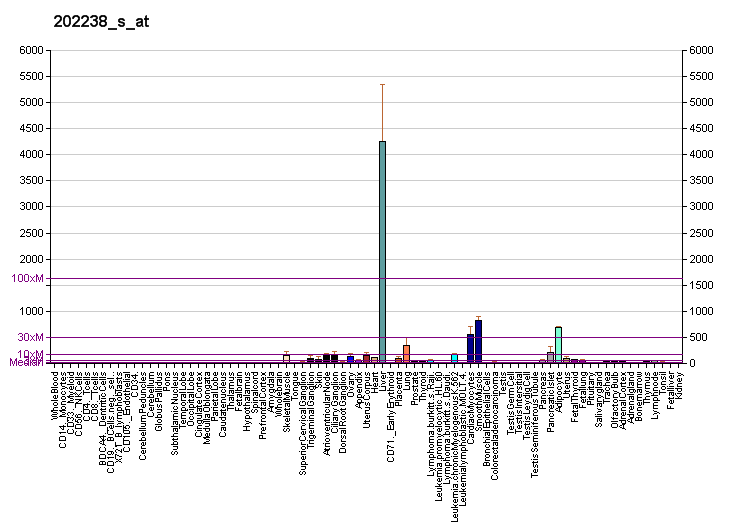

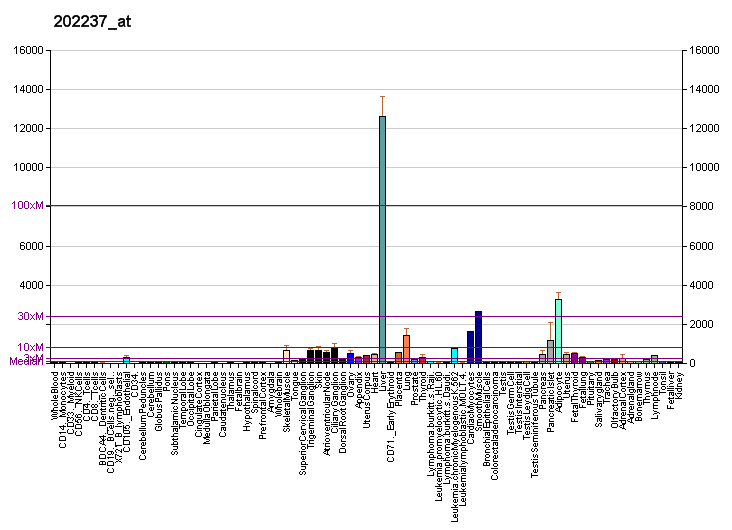
RNA expression pattern
Bgee	Human / Mouse (ortholog); Top expressed in: tendon of biceps brachii; pericardium; vena cava; Descending thoracic aorta; right lobe of liver; Achilles tendon; ascending aorta; popliteal artery; tibial arteries; gastric mucosa / Top expressed in: left lobe of liver; subcutaneous adipose tissue; white adipose tissue; intercostal muscle; calvaria; tunica adventitia of aorta; ascending aorta; stroma of bone marrow; lactiferous gland; endothelial cell of lymphatic vessel; More reference expression data
BioGPS	More reference expression data
Gene ontology
Molecular function	methyltransferase activity; transferase activity; nicotinamide N-methyltransferase activity; pyridine N-methyltransferase activity
Cellular component	cytoplasm; cytosol
Biological process	methylation; animal organ regeneration; response to organonitrogen compound; NAD biosynthesis via nicotinamide riboside salvage pathway
Sources:Amigo / QuickGO
Orthologs
Databases	NCBI: entry; OMA: entry
Species	Human	Mouse
Entrez	4837	18113
Ensembl	ENSG00000166741	ENSMUSG00000032271
UniProt	P40261	O55239
RefSeq (mRNA)	NM_006169	NM_001311062; NM_010924
RefSeq (protein)	NP_006160; NP_001358974; NP_001358975; NP_001358976	NP_001297991; NP_035054
Location (UCSC)	Chr 11: 114.26 – 114.31 Mb	Chr 9: 48.5 – 48.52 Mb
PubMed search
- Wikidata
View/Edit Human	View/Edit Mouse

Nicotinamide N-methyltransferase (NNMT) is an enzyme that in humans is encoded by the NNMT gene. NNMT catalyzes the methylation of nicotinamide and similar compounds using the methyl donor S-adenosyl methionine (SAM-e) to produce S-adenosyl-L-homocysteine (SAH) and 1-methylnicotinamide.

== Function ==
Methylation of nicotinamide by NNMT and SAM-e is the major pathway for degradation of nicotinamide leading to excretion in the urine.

== Clinical significance ==
NNMT is highly expressed in the human liver. N-methylation is one method by which drug and other xenobiotic compounds are metabolized by the liver. NNMT expression in adipose tissue is associated with obesity and insulin resistance. Contrary to the negative effects of increased NNMT in adipose tissue, increased NNMT in liver is associated with a better metabolic profile, namely reduced serum triglycerides and free fatty acids. In adipose tissue, NNMT can lead to methylation depletion, whereas because of the many methylation enzymes in the liver NNMT has a negligible effect on liver methylation. But in the liver, the 1-methylnicotinamide produced by NNMT degradation of nicotinamide increases sirtuin 1 (SIRT1) by inhibiting degradation of that protein. Overexpression of SIRT1 in mice has been shown to reduce insulin and fasting glucose, as well as increased metabolism and physical function.

Abundant availability of nicotinamide leads to depletion of both nicotinamide adenine dinucleotide (NAD+) and SAM-e, resulting in liver steatosis and fibrosis, causing the progression from non-alcoholic fatty liver disease (NAFLD) to non-alcoholic steatohepatitis (NASH).

Human embryonic stem cells expression of NNMT is believed to help maintain the cells in a naive state.

NNMT expression is significantly upregulated in many cancers, including pancreatic cancer where levels of NNMT enzyme correlate with increased risk of death. The cause of these correlations has not been established, but may be related to the fact that NNMT enzyme is an inhibitor of DNA repair. NNMT and 1-methylnicotinamide inhibit autophagy in breast cancer, protecting breast cancer cells against oxidative stress. NNMT has been suggested to be a biomarker of cancer.
