= Drugs secreted in the kidney =

This is a table of drugs that are secreted in the kidney.

Acid medication are, because of pH partition, secreted to a higher extent when urine is basic. In the same way, basic medications are secreted to a higher extent when urine is acidic.

Medication	Location	Acid or base	anion or cation	Percentage excreted
para-aminohippurate	proximal tubule	Acid	anion	
furosemide	proximal tubule	Acid	anion	100-75
glucuronic acid-conjugates	proximal tubule	Acid		
glycine conjugates	proximal tubule	Acid		
indometacin	proximal tubule	Acid	anion	
methotrexate	proximal tubule	Acid		100-75
penicillin	proximal tubule	Acid	anion	75-50 (benzylpenicillin)
probenecid	proximal tubule	Acid	anion	
sulphate conjugates	proximal tubule	Acid		
thiazide diuretics	proximal tubule	Acid		
uric acid	proximal tubule	Acid		
amiloride	proximal tubule	Base	cation	
dopamine	proximal tubule	Base		
histamine	proximal tubule	Base		
mepacrine	proximal tubule	Base		
morphine	proximal tubule	Base	cation	
pethidine	proximal tubule	Base		
quaternary ammonium compounds	proximal tubule	Base		
quinine	proximal tubule	Base	cation	
5-hydroxytryptamine (serotonin)	proximal tubule	Base		
triamterene	proximal tubule	Base		
gentamicin				100-75
atenolol				100-75
digoxin				100-75
cimetidine			cation	75-50
tetracycline				75-50 (oxytetracycline)
neostigmine				75-50
propantheline				~50
tubocurarine				~50
acetazolamide	proximal tubule		anion	
chlorothiazide	proximal tubule		anion	
saccharin	proximal tubule		anion	
salicylate	proximal tubule		anion	
atropine	proximal tubule		cation	
NMN	proximal tubule		cation	
paraquat	proximal tubule		cation	
procainamide	proximal tubule		cation	
tetraethylammonium	proximal tubule		cation	
chlorpromazine	proximal tubule		cation	
