= Nae =

Nae is both a surname and a given name. It may refer to:

Surname:

- Eugen Nae (born 1974), Romanian footballer
- Marius Nae (born 1981), Romanian footballer

Given name:

- Nae Caranfil (born 1960), Romanian film director and screenwriter
- Nae Ionescu (1890–1940), Romanian philosopher, logician, mathematician, academic, writer and journalist

== See also ==
- NAE (disambiguation)
