= Free water clearance =

In the physiology of the kidney, free water clearance (C_{H_{2}O}) is the volume of blood plasma that is cleared of solute-free water per unit time. An example of its use is in the determination of an individual's state of hydration. Conceptually, free water clearance should be thought of relative to the production of isoosmotic urine, which would be equal to the osmolarity of the plasma. If an individual is producing urine more dilute than the plasma, there is a positive value for free water clearance, meaning pure water is lost in the urine in addition to a theoretical isoosmotic filtrate. If the urine is more concentrated than the plasma, then free water is being extracted from the urine, giving a negative value for free water clearance. A negative value is typical for free water clearance, as the kidney usually produces concentrated urine except in the cases of volume overload by the individual.

== Overview ==
At its simplest, the kidney produces urine composed of solute and pure (solute-free) water. How rapidly the kidney clears the blood plasma of a substance (be it water or solute) is the renal clearance, which is related to the rate of urine production. The rate at which plasma is cleared of solute is the osmolal clearance; the rate at which plasma is cleared of solute-free water is the free water clearance.

== Calculation ==
Since urine flow is determined by the rate at which plasma is cleared of solutes and water (as discussed above), urine flow (V) is given as the sum of osmolar (C_{osm}) and free water clearance (C_{H_{2}O}):

$$V = C_{osm} + C_{H_2O}$$

Rearranging yields C_{H_{2}O}

$$C_{H_2O} = V - C_{osm}$$

Since osmolar clearance is given as the product of urine flow rate and the ratio of urine to plasma osmolality, this is commonly represented as

$$C_{H_2O} = V - \frac{U_{osm}}{P_{osm}}V = ( 1 - \frac{U_{osm}}{P_{osm}} ) V$$

For example, for an individual with a urine osmolality of 140 mOsm/L, plasma osmolality of 280 mOsm/L, and a urine production of 4 ml/min, the free water clearance is 2 ml/min, obtained from

$$C_{H_2O} = 4 \ \mbox{ml/min} - \frac{140 \ \mbox{mOsm/L}}{280 \ \mbox{mOsm/L}} \times 4 \ \mbox{ml/min} = 2 \ \mbox{ml/min}$$

== Interpretation ==
Free water clearance can be used as an indicator of how the body is regulating water. A free water clearance of zero means the kidney is producing urine isosmotic with respect to the plasma. Values greater than zero imply that the kidney is producing dilute urine through the excretion of solute-free water. Values less than zero imply that the kidney is conserving water (likely under the influence of antidiuretic hormone, ADH), resulting in the production of concentrated urine.

== See also ==
- Renal clearance
- Renal physiology
