= Nicotinamide N-methyltransferase =

Class of enzymes

Identifiers
- EC no.: 2.1.1.1
- CAS no.: 9029-74-7

Databases
- BRENDA: enzyme data
- ExPASy: NiceZyme view
- KEGG: enzyme entry
- MetaCyc: metabolic pathway
- Rhea: reactions
- PDB structures: RCSB PDB PDBe PDBsum
- Gene Ontology: AmiGO / QuickGO
Search
- PMC: articles
- PubMed: articles
- NCBI: proteins

Nicotinamide N-methyltransferase (NNMT) (EC 2.1.1.1) is an enzyme that catalyzes the chemical reaction

Nicotinamide
+ SAM
1-Methylnicotinamide
+ SAH

The enzyme catalyses a methylation reaction in which nicotinamide is converted to 1-methylnicotinamide. The methyl group comes from the cofactor, S-adenosyl methionine (SAM), which loses its methyl group and becomes S-adenosyl-L-homocysteine (SAH).

This enzyme belongs to the family of transferases, specifically those transferring one-carbon group methyltransferases. The systematic name of this enzyme class is S-adenosyl-L-methionine:nicotinamide N-methyltransferase. This enzyme is also called nicotinamide methyltransferase.

The substrate spectrum is S-Adenosyl-L-methionine + 1,2,3,4-tetrahydroisoquinoline, S-Adenosyl-L-methionine + isoquinoline, S-Adenosyl-L-methionine + quinoline, S-Adenosyl-L-methionine + 3-acetylpyridine, S-Adenosyl-L-methionine + thionicotinamide, and S-Adenosyl-L-methionine + nicotinamide (L-methionine + nicotinamide.

== Function ==
This enzyme participates in nicotinate and nicotinamide metabolism. In humans it is encoded by the NNMT gene.

NNMT affects a biochemical mechanism known as a futile cycle, which plays a role in metabolic regulation. NNMT is found in human fat cells and the liver. NNMT processes vitamin B3 and has been linked with certain types of cancer. Silencing the gene that codes for NNMT reduces its presence and increases the presence of sugar transporter GLUT4.

Mice that produced large amounts of GLUT4 were insulin sensitive and protected against diabetes, while mice with no GLUT4 were insulin resistant and at risk. High levels of NNMT are often found in the fat cells of animals that are insulin resistant. When the researchers silenced the NNMT gene in mice on high-fat diets, the mice gained less weight than those in whom the NNMT gene was functioning normally. (The mice did not change their eating or exercise habits).

Antisense oligonucleotide (ASO) technology can be used to silence the expression of the NNMT gene only in fat and liver cells. ASOs are short strings of DNA that can be designed to prevent the synthesis of specific proteins. ASOs have been approved for use by the U.S. Food and Drug Administration for the treatment of conditions with other genetic causes—such as elevated cholesterol and hyperlipidemia.

== Structural studies ==
As of late 2007, two structures have been solved for this class of enzymes, with PDB accession codes PDB: 2I62 and PDB: 2IIP.
