= Titratable acid =

In chemistry, titratable acid generally refers to any acid that can lose one or more protons in an acid–base reaction.

The term is used slightly differently in other fields. For example, in renal physiology, titratable acid is a term to describe acids such as phosphoric acid, sulfuric acid which are involved in renal physiology. It is used to explicitly exclude ammonium (NH_{4}^{+}) as a source of acid, and is part of the calculation for net acid excretion.

It gets its name from the use of NaOH in acid–base titration to estimate the quantity of titratable acid.

== See also ==
- Acids in wine
