= Cl-oxalate exchanger =

Transport protein in the kidney

The Cl-oxalate exchanger is a transport protein in the kidney, where it functions in e.g. renal chloride reabsorption.
