= Countercurrent exchange =

Mechanism occurring in nature and mimicked in industry and engineering

Counter heat current exchange: Note the gradually declining differential and that the once hot and cold streams exit with a reversed temperature difference; the hotter entering stream becomes the exiting cooler stream and vice versa.

Countercurrent exchange is a mechanism between two flowing bodies flowing in opposite directions to each other, in which there is a transfer of some property, usually heat or some chemical. The flowing bodies can be liquids, gases, or even solid powders, or any combination of those. For example, in a distillation column, the vapors bubble up through the downward flowing liquid while exchanging both heat and mass. It occurs in nature and is mimicked in industry and engineering. It is a kind of exchange using counter flow arrangement.

The maximum amount of heat or mass transfer that can be obtained is higher with countercurrent than co-current (parallel) exchange because countercurrent maintains a slowly declining difference or gradient (usually temperature or concentration difference). In cocurrent exchange the initial gradient is higher but falls off quickly, leading to wasted potential. For example, in the adjacent diagram, the fluid being heated (exiting top) has a higher exiting temperature than the cooled fluid (exiting bottom) that was used for heating. With cocurrent or parallel exchange the heated and cooled fluids can only approach one another. The result is that countercurrent exchange can achieve a greater amount of heat or mass transfer than parallel under otherwise similar conditions.

Countercurrent exchange when set up in a circuit or loop can be used for building up concentrations, heat, or other properties of flowing liquids. Specifically when set up in a loop with a buffering liquid between the incoming and outgoing fluid running in a circuit, and with active transport pumps on the outgoing fluid's tubes, the system is called a countercurrent multiplier, enabling a multiplied effect of many small pumps to gradually build up a large concentration in the buffer liquid.

Other countercurrent exchange circuits where the incoming and outgoing fluids touch each other are used for retaining a high concentration of a dissolved substance or for retaining heat, or for allowing the external buildup of the heat or concentration at one point in the system.

Countercurrent exchange circuits or loops are found extensively in nature, specifically in biologic systems. In vertebrates, they are called a rete mirabile, originally the name of an organ in fish gills for absorbing oxygen from the water. It is mimicked in industrial systems. Countercurrent exchange is a key concept in chemical engineering thermodynamics and manufacturing processes, for example in extracting sucrose from sugar beet roots.

Countercurrent multiplication is a similar but different concept where liquid moves in a loop followed by a long length of movement in opposite directions with an intermediate zone. The tube leading to the loop passively building up a gradient of heat (or cooling) or solvent concentration while the returning tube has a constant small pumping action all along it, so that a gradual intensification of the heat or concentration is created towards the loop. Countercurrent multiplication has been found in the kidneys as well as in many other biological organs.

== Three current exchange systems ==
Three topologies of countercurrent exchange systems

Countercurrent exchange and cocurrent exchange are two mechanisms used to transfer some property of a fluid from one flowing current of fluid to another across a barrier allowing one way flow of the property between them. The property transferred could be heat, concentration of a chemical substance, or other properties of the flow.

When heat is transferred, a thermally-conductive membrane is used between the two tubes, and when the concentration of a chemical substance is transferred a semipermeable membrane is used.

=== Cocurrent flow—half transfer ===
A comparison between the operations and effects of a cocurrent and a countercurrent flow exchange system is depicted by the upper and lower diagrams respectively. In both it is assumed (and indicated) that red has a higher value (e.g. of temperature) than blue and that the property being transported in the channels therefore flows from red to blue. Channels are contiguous if effective exchange is to occur (i.e. there can be no gap between the channels).

In the cocurrent flow exchange mechanism, the two fluids flow in the same direction.

As the cocurrent and countercurrent exchange mechanisms diagram showed, a cocurrent exchange system has a variable gradient over the length of the exchanger. With equal flows in the two tubes, this method of exchange is only capable of moving half of the property from one flow to the other, no matter how long the exchanger is.

If each stream changes its property to be 50% closer to that of the opposite stream's inlet condition, exchange will stop when the point of equilibrium is reached, and the gradient has declined to zero. In the case of unequal flows, the equilibrium condition will occur somewhat closer to the conditions of the stream with the higher flow.

==== Cocurrent flow examples ====
Cocurrent and countercurrent heat exchange

A cocurrent heat exchanger is an example of a cocurrent flow exchange mechanism. Two tubes have a liquid flowing in the same direction. One starts off hot at 60 °C (140 °F), the second cold at 20 °C (68 °F). A thermoconductive membrane or an open section allows heat transfer between the two flows.

The hot fluid heats the cold one, and the cold fluid cools down the warm one. The result is thermal equilibrium: Both fluids end up at around the same temperature: 40 °C (104 °F), almost exactly between the two original temperatures (20 °C (68 °F) and 60 °C (140 °F)). At the input end, there is a large temperature difference of 40 °C (104 °F) and much heat transfer; at the output end, there is a very small temperature difference (both are at the same temperature of 40 °C (104 °F) or close to it), and very little heat transfer if any at all. If the equilibrium—where both tubes are at the same temperature—is reached before the exit of the liquid from the tubes, no further heat transfer will be achieved along the remaining length of the tubes.

A similar example is the cocurrent concentration exchange. The system consists of two tubes, one with brine (concentrated saltwater), the other with freshwater (which has a low concentration of salt in it), and a semi permeable membrane which allows only water to pass between the two, in an osmotic process. Many of the water molecules pass from the freshwater flow in order to dilute the brine, while the concentration of salt in the freshwater constantly grows (since the salt is not leaving this flow, while water is). This will continue, until both flows reach a similar dilution, with a concentration somewhere close to midway between the two original dilutions. Once that happens, there will be no more flow between the two tubes, since both are at a similar dilution and there is no more osmotic pressure.

=== Countercurrent flow—almost full transfer ===
Spiral counter-current heat exchange schematic

In countercurrent flow, the two flows move in opposite directions.

Two tubes have a liquid flowing in opposite directions, transferring a property from one tube to the other. For example, this could be transferring heat from a hot flow of liquid to a cold one, or transferring the concentration of a dissolved solute from a high concentration flow of liquid to a low concentration flow.

The counter-current exchange system can maintain a nearly constant gradient between the two flows over their entire length of contact. With a sufficiently long length and a sufficiently low flow rate this can result in almost all of the property transferred. So, for example, in the case of heat exchange, the exiting liquid will be almost as hot as the original incoming liquid's heat.

==== Countercurrent flow examples ====
In a countercurrent heat exchanger, the hot fluid becomes cold, and the cold fluid becomes hot.

In this example, hot water at 60 °C (140 °F) enters the top pipe. It warms water in the bottom pipe which has been warmed up along the way, to almost 60 °C (140 °F). A minute but existing heat difference still exists, and a small amount of heat is transferred, so that the water leaving the bottom pipe is at close to 60 °C (140 °F). Because the hot input is at its maximum temperature of 60 °C (140 °F), and the exiting water at the bottom pipe is nearly at that temperature but not quite, the water in the top pipe can warm the one in the bottom pipe to nearly its own temperature. At the cold end—the water exit from the top pipe, because the cold water entering the bottom pipe is still cold at 20 °C (68 °F), it can extract the last of the heat from the now-cooled hot water in the top pipe, bringing its temperature down nearly to the level of the cold input fluid (21 °C (70 °F)).

The result is that the top pipe which received hot water, now has cold water leaving it at 20 °C (68 °F), while the bottom pipe which received cold water, is now emitting hot water at close to 60 °C (140 °F). In effect, most of the heat was transferred.

==== Conditions for higher transfer results ====
Nearly complete transfer in systems implementing countercurrent exchange, is only possible if the two flows are, in some sense, "equal".

For a maximum transfer of substance concentration, an equal flowrate of solvents and solutions is required. For maximum heat transfer, the average specific heat capacity and the mass flow rate must be the same for each stream. If the two flows are not equal, for example if heat is being transferred from water to air or vice versa, then, similar to cocurrent exchange systems, a variation in the gradient is expected because of a buildup of the property not being transferred properly.

== Countercurrent exchange in biological systems ==
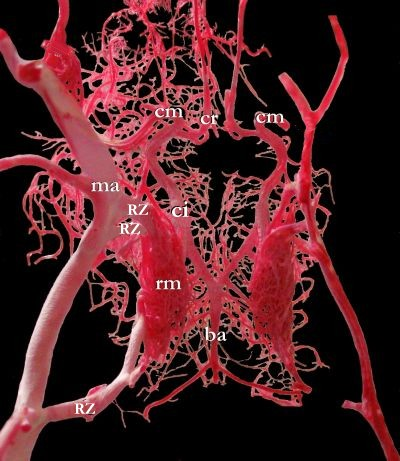
Rete mirabile = RM

Countercurrent exchange is used extensively in biological systems for a wide variety of purposes. For example, fish use it in their gills to transfer oxygen from the surrounding water into their blood, and birds use a countercurrent heat exchanger between blood vessels in their legs to keep heat concentrated within their bodies. In vertebrates, this type of organ is referred to as a rete mirabile (originally the name of the organ in the fish gills). Mammalian kidneys use countercurrent exchange to remove water from urine so the body can retain water used to move the nitrogenous waste products (see countercurrent multiplier).

=== Countercurrent multiplication loop ===
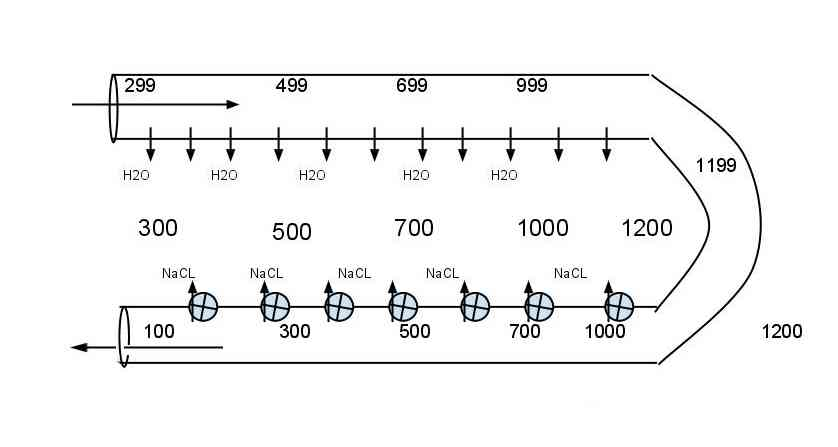
Counter current multiplication loop diagram

A countercurrent multiplication loop is a system where fluid flows in a loop so that the entrance and exit are at similar low concentration of a dissolved substance but at the far end of the loop there is a high concentration of that substance. A buffer liquid between the incoming and outgoing tubes receives the concentrated substance. The incoming and outgoing tubes do not touch each other.

The system allows the buildup of a high concentration gradually, by allowing a natural buildup of concentration towards the tip inside the in-going tube, (for example using osmosis of water out of the input pipe and into the buffer fluid), and the use of many active transport pumps each pumping only against a very small gradient, during the exit from the loop, returning the concentration inside the output pipe to its original concentration.

The incoming flow starting at a low concentration has a semipermeable membrane with water passing to the buffer liquid via osmosis at a small gradient. There is a gradual buildup of concentration inside the loop until the loop tip where it reaches its maximum.

Theoretically a similar system could exist or be constructed for heat exchange.

In the example shown in the image, water enters at 299 mg/L (NaCl / H_{2}O). Water passes because of a small osmotic pressure to the buffer liquid in this example at 300 mg/L (NaCl / H_{2}O). Further up the loop there is a continued flow of water out of the tube and into the buffer, gradually raising the concentration of NaCl in the tube until it reaches 1199 mg/L at the tip. The buffer liquid between the two tubes is at a gradually rising concentration, always a bit over the incoming fluid, in this example reaching 1200 mg/L. This is regulated by the pumping action on the returning tube as will be explained immediately.

The tip of the loop has the highest concentration of salt (NaCl) in the incoming tube—in the example 1199 mg/L, and in the buffer 1200 mg/L. The returning tube has active transport pumps, pumping salt out to the buffer liquid at a low difference of concentrations of up to 200 mg/L more than in the tube. Thus when opposite the 1000 mg/L in the buffer liquid, the concentration in the tube is 800 and only 200 mg/L are needed to be pumped out. But the same is true anywhere along the line, so that at exit of the loop also only 200 mg/L need to be pumped.

In effect, this can be seen as a gradually multiplying effect—hence the name of the phenomena: a 'countercurrent multiplier' or the mechanism: Countercurrent multiplication, but in current engineering terms, countercurrent multiplication is any process where only slight pumping is needed, due to the constant small difference of concentration or heat along the process, gradually raising to its maximum. There is no need for a buffer liquid, if the desired effect is receiving a high concentration at the output pipe.

==== In the kidney ====
Nephron Ion flow diagram

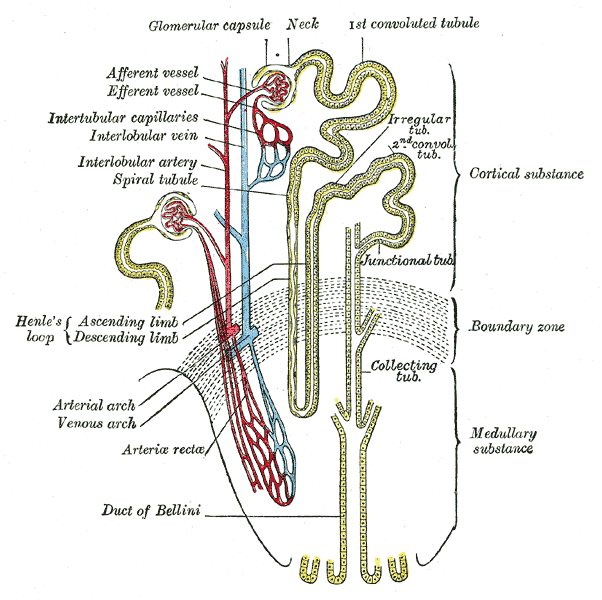
Loop of Henle (Gray's Anatomy book)

A circuit of fluid in the loop of Henle—an important part of the kidneys—allows for gradual buildup of the concentration of urine in the kidneys, by using active transport on the exiting nephrons (tubules carrying liquid in the process of gradually concentrating the urea). The active transport pumps need only to overcome a constant and low gradient of concentration, because of the countercurrent multiplier mechanism.

Various substances are passed from the liquid entering the nephrons until exiting the loop (See the nephron flow diagram). The sequence of flow is as follows:

- Renal corpuscle: Liquid enters the nephron system at the Bowman's capsule.
- Proximal convoluted tubule: It then may reabsorb urea in the thick descending limb. Water is removed from the nephrons by osmosis (and glucose and other ions are pumped out with active transport), gradually raising the concentration in the nephrons.
- Loop of Henle Descending: The liquid passes from the thin descending limb to the thick ascending limb. Water is constantly released via osmosis. Gradually there is a buildup of osmotic concentration, until 1200 mOsm is reached at the loop tip, but the difference across the membrane is kept small and constant.

For example, the liquid at one section inside the thin descending limb is at 400 mOsm while outside it is 401. Further down the descending limb, the inside concentration is 500 while outside it is 501, so a constant difference of 1 mOsm is kept all across the membrane, although the concentration inside and outside are gradually increasing.

- Loop of Henle Ascending: after the tip (or 'bend') of the loop, the liquid flows in the thin ascending limb. Salt–sodium Na^{+} and chloride Cl^{−} ions are pumped out of the liquid gradually lowering the concentration in the exiting liquid, but, using the countercurrent multiplier mechanism, always pumping against a constant and small osmotic difference.

For example, the pumps at a section close to the bend, pump out from 1000 mOsm inside the ascending limb to 1200 mOsm outside it, with a 200 mOsm across. Pumps further up the thin ascending limb, pump out from 400 mOsm into liquid at 600 mOsm, so again the difference is retained at 200 mOsm from the inside to the outside, while the concentration both inside and outside are gradually decreasing as the liquid flow advances.

The liquid finally reaches a low concentration of 100 mOsm when leaving the thin ascending limb and passing through the thick one

- Distal convoluted tubule: Once leaving the loop of Henle the thick ascending limb can optionally reabsorb and re increase the concentration in the nephrons.
- Collecting duct: The collecting duct receives liquid between 100 mOsm if no re-absorption is done, to 300 or above if re-absorption was used. The collecting duct may continue raising the concentration if required, by gradually pumping out the same ions as the Distal convoluted tubule, using the same gradient as the ascending limbs in the loop of Henle, and reaching the same concentration.
- Ureter: The liquid urine leaves to the ureter.
- Same principle is used in hemodialysis within artificial kidney machines.

==== History ====
Initially the countercurrent exchange mechanism and its properties were proposed in 1951 by professor Werner Kuhn and two of his former students who called the mechanism found in the loop of Henle in mammalian kidneys a Countercurrent multiplier and confirmed by laboratory findings in 1958 by Professor Carl W. Gottschalk. The theory was acknowledged a year later after a meticulous study showed that there is almost no osmotic difference between liquids on both sides of nephrons. Homer Smith, a considerable contemporary authority on renal physiology, opposed the model countercurrent concentration for 8 years, until conceding ground in 1959. Ever since, many similar mechanisms have been found in biologic systems, the most notable of these: the rete mirabile in fish.

=== Countercurrent exchange of heat in organisms ===
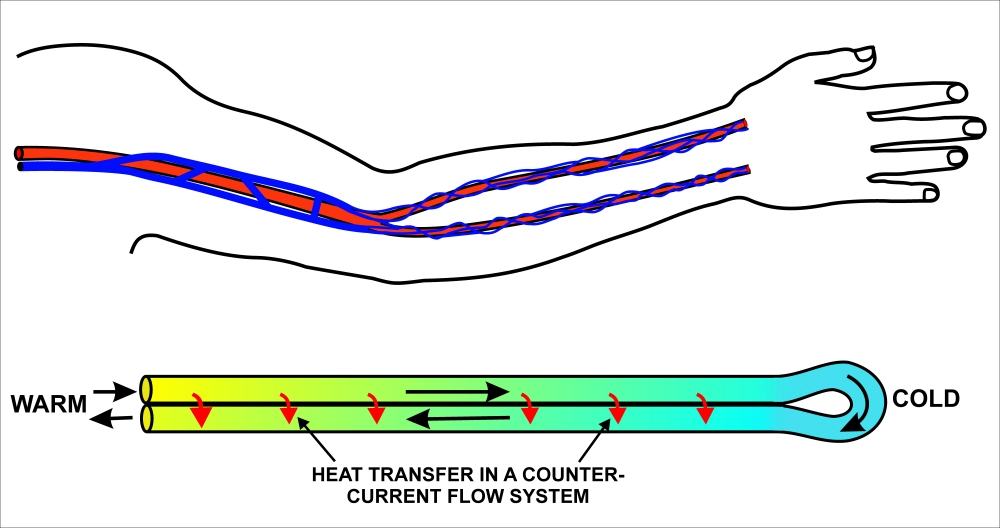
The arterial and deep vein blood supply to the human arm. The superficial (subcutaneous) veins are not shown. The deep veins are wrapped around the arteries, and the consequent counter-current flow allows the hand to be cooled down considerably without loss of body heat, which is short-circuited by the counter current flow.

In cold weather the blood flow to the limbs of birds and mammals is reduced on exposure to cold environmental conditions, and returned to the trunk via the deep veins which lie alongside the arteries (forming venae comitantes). This acts as a counter-current exchange system which short-circuits the warmth from the arterial blood directly into the venous blood returning into the trunk, causing minimal heat loss from the extremities in cold weather. The subcutaneous limb veins are tightly constricted, thereby reducing heat loss via this route, and forcing the blood returning from the extremities into the counter-current blood flow systems in the centers of the limbs. Birds and mammals that regularly immerse their limbs in cold or icy water have particularly well developed counter-current blood flow systems to their limbs, allowing prolonged exposure of the extremities to the cold without significant loss of body heat, even when the limbs are as thin as the lower legs, or tarsi, of a bird, for instance.

When animals like the leatherback turtle and dolphins are in colder water to which they are not acclimatized, they use this CCHE mechanism to prevent heat loss from their flippers, tail flukes, and dorsal fins. Such CCHE systems are made up of a complex network of peri-arterial venous plexuses, or venae comitantes, that run through the blubber from their minimally insulated limbs and thin streamlined protuberances. Each plexus consists of a central artery containing warm blood from the heart surrounded by a bundle of veins containing cool blood from the body surface. As these fluids flow past each other, they create a heat gradient in which heat is transferred and retained inside the body. The warm arterial blood transfers most of its heat to the cool venous blood now coming in from the outside. This conserves heat by recirculating it back to the body core. Since the arteries give up a good deal of their heat in this exchange, there is less heat lost through convection at the periphery surface.

Another example is found in the legs of an Arctic fox treading on snow. The paws are necessarily cold, but blood can circulate to bring nutrients to the paws without losing much heat from the body. Proximity of arteries and veins in the leg results in heat exchange, so that as the blood flows down it becomes cooler, and does not lose much heat to the snow. As the (cold) blood flows back up from the paws through the veins, it picks up heat from the blood flowing in the opposite direction, so that it returns to the torso in a warm state, allowing the fox to maintain a comfortable temperature, without losing it to the snow. This system is so efficient that the Arctic fox does not begin to shiver until the temperature drops to −70 °C (−94 °F).

=== Countercurrent exchange in sea and desert birds to conserve water ===
Sea and desert birds have been found to have a salt gland near the nostrils which concentrates brine, later to be "sneezed" out to the sea, in effect allowing these birds to drink seawater without the need to find freshwater resources. It also enables the seabirds to remove the excess salt entering the body when eating, swimming or diving in the sea for food. The kidney cannot remove these quantities and concentrations of salt.

The salt secreting gland has been found in seabirds like pelicans, petrels, albatrosses, gulls, and terns. It has also been found in Namibian ostriches and other desert birds, where a buildup of salt concentration is due to dehydration and scarcity of drinking water.

In seabirds the salt gland is above the beak, leading to a main canal above the beak, and water is blown from two small nostrils on the beak, to empty it. The salt gland has two countercurrent mechanisms working in it:

a. A salt extraction system with a countercurrent multiplication mechanism, where salt is actively pumped from the blood 'venules' (small veins) into the gland tubules. Although the fluid in the tubules is with a higher concentration of salt than the blood, the flow is arranged in a countercurrent exchange, so that the blood with a high concentration of salt enters the system close to where the gland tubules exit and connect to the main canal. Thus, all along the gland, there is only a small gradient to climb, in order to push the salt from the blood to the salty fluid with active transport powered by ATP.

b. The blood supply system to the gland is set in countercurrent exchange loop mechanism for keeping the high concentration of salt in the gland's blood, so that it does not leave back to the blood system.

The glands remove the salt efficiently and thus allow the birds to drink the salty water from their environment while they are hundreds of miles away from land.

== Countercurrent exchange in industry and scientific research ==
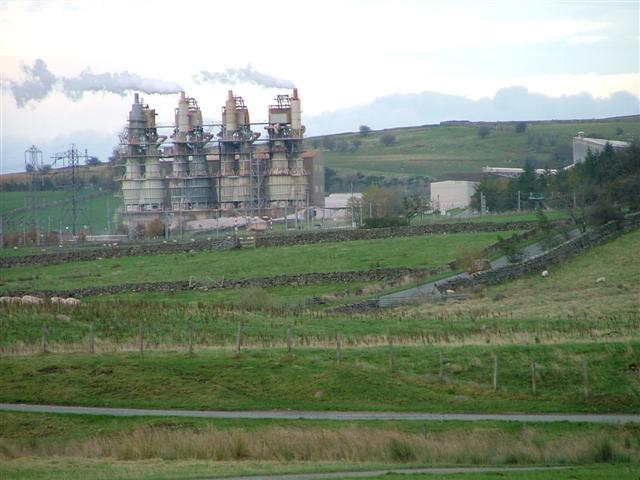
Hardendale Lime Works in the UK using countercurrent kilns to reach high temperatures

Countercurrent Chromatography is a method of separation, that is based on the differential partitioning of analytes between two immiscible liquids using countercurrent or cocurrent flow. Evolving from Craig's Countercurrent Distribution (CCD), the most widely used term and abbreviation is CounterCurrent Chromatography (CCC), in particular when using hydrodynamic CCC instruments. The term partition chromatography is largely a synonymous and predominantly used for hydrostatic CCC instruments.

- Distillation of chemicals such as in petroleum refining is done in towers or columns with perforated trays. Vapor from the low boiling fractions bubbles upward through the holes in the trays in contact with the down flowing high boiling fractions. The concentration of low boiling fraction increases in each tray up the tower as it is "stripped". The low boiling fraction is drawn off the top of the tower and the high boiling fraction drawn from the bottom. The process in the trays is a combination of heat transfer and mass transfer. Heat is supplied at the bottom, known as a "reboiler" and cooling is done with a condenser at the top.

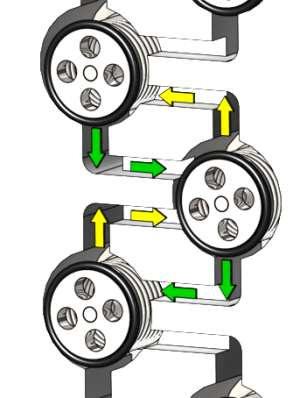
Counter flow in liquid–liquid extraction

- Liquid–liquid extraction (also called 'solvent extraction' or 'partitioning') is a common method for extracting a substance from one liquid into another liquid at a different 'phase' (such as "slurry"). This method, which implements a countercurrent mechanism, is used in nuclear reprocessing, ore processing, the production of fine organic compounds, the processing of perfumes, the production of vegetable oils and biodiesel, and other industries.
- Gold can be separated from a cyanide solution with the Merrill–Crowe process using Counter Current Decantation (CCD). In some mines, nickel and cobalt are treated with CCD, after the original ore was treated with concentrated sulfuric acid and steam in titanium covered autoclaves, producing nickel cobalt slurry. The nickel and cobalt in the slurry are removed from it almost completely using a CCD system exchanging the cobalt and nickel with flash steam heated water.

Countercurrent furnace (kiln) heat exchange

- Lime can be manufactured in countercurrent furnaces allowing the heat to reach high temperatures using low cost, low temperature burning fuel. Historically this was developed by the Japanese in certain types of the Anagama kiln. The kiln is built in stages, where fresh air coming to the fuel is passed downwards while the smoke and heat is pushed up and out. The heat does not leave the kiln, but is transferred back to the incoming air, and thus slowly builds up to 3,000 °C (5,430 °F) and more.

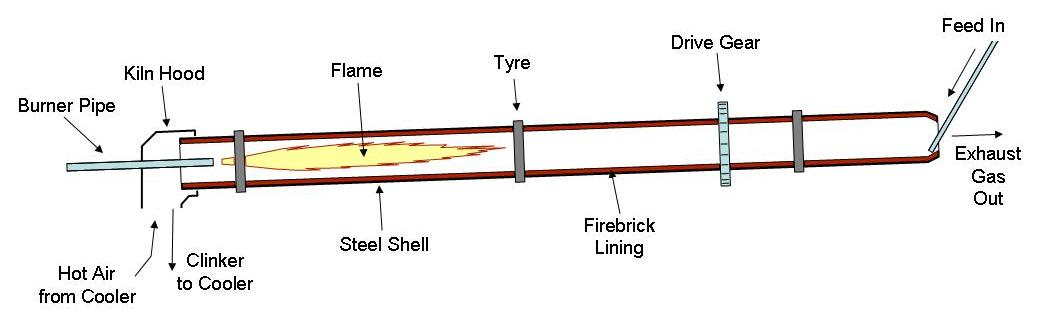
Cement counter-current rotary kiln

- Cement may be created using a countercurrent kiln where the heat is passed in the cement and the exhaust combined, while the incoming air draft is passed along the two, absorbing the heat and retaining it inside the furnace, finally reaching high temperatures.
- Gasification: the process of creating methane and carbon monoxide from organic or fossil matter, can be done using a counter-current fixed bed ("up draft") gasifier which is built in a similar way to the Anagama kiln, and must therefore withstand more harsh conditions, but reaches better efficiency.
- In nuclear power plants, water leaving the plant must not contain even trace particles of Uranium. Counter Current Decantation (CCD) is used in some facilities to extract water, totally clear of Uranium.

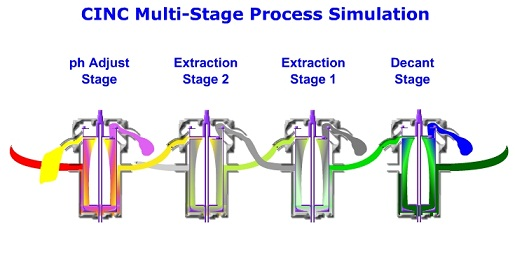
Exchange current decantation depicted in centrifugal extractors as 1st stage

- Zippe-type centrifuges use countercurrent multiplication between rising and falling convection currents to reduce the number of stages needed in a cascade.
- Some Centrifugal extractors use counter current exchange mechanisms for extracting high rates of the desired material.
- Some protein skimmers (devices used to clean saltwater pools and fish ponds of organic matter) use counter current technologies.
- Countercurrent processes have also been used to study the behavior of small animals and isolate individuals with altered behaviors due to genetic mutations.

== See also ==
- Anagama kiln
- Bidirectional traffic
- Economizer
- Heat recovery ventilation
- Regenerative heat exchanger
- Countercurrent multiplier
