= Transcellular transport =

Movement of a biological substance through a cell's membrane

Transcellular transport involves the transportation of solutes by a cell through a cell. Transcellular transport can occur in three different ways: active transport, passive transport, and transcytosis.

== Active transport ==
Active transport is the process of moving molecules from an area of low concentrations to an area of high concentration. There are two types of active transport, primary active transport and secondary active transport. Primary active transport uses adenosine triphosphate (ATP) to move specific molecules and solutes against its concentration gradient. Examples of molecules that follow this process are potassium K^{+}, sodium Na^{+}, and calcium Ca^{2+}. A place in the human body where this occurs is in the intestines with the uptake of glucose. Secondary active transport is when one solute moves down the electrochemical gradient to produce enough energy to force the transport of another solute from low concentration to high concentration. An example of where this occurs is in the movement of glucose within the proximal convoluted tubule (PCT).

== Passive transport ==
Passive transport is the process of moving molecules from an area of high concentration to an area of low concentration without expelling any energy. There are two types of passive transport, passive diffusion and facilitated diffusion. Passive diffusion is the unassisted movement of molecules from high concentration to low concentration across a permeable membrane. One example of passive diffusion is the gas exchange that occurs between the oxygen in the blood and the carbon dioxide present in the lungs. Facilitated diffusion is the movement of polar molecules down the concentration gradient with the assistance of membrane proteins. Since the molecules associated with facilitated diffusion are polar, they are repelled by the hydrophobic sections of permeable membrane, therefore they need to be assisted by the membrane proteins. Both types of passive transport will continue until the system reaches equilibrium. One example of facilitated diffusion is the movement glucose from small intestine epithelial cells into the extracellular matrix of the blood capillaries.

== Transcytosis ==
Transcytosis is the movement of large molecules across the interior of a cell. This process occurs by engulfing the molecule as it moves across the interior of the cell and then releasing the molecule on the other side. There are two types of transcytosis are receptor-mediated transcytosis (RMT) and adsorptive-mediated transcytosis (AMT). An example where both types of transcytosis occur is the movement of macromolecules across the blood-brain barrier (BBB) into the central nervous system (CNS).

== Paracellular transport ==
In contrast, paracellular transport is the transfer of substances across an epithelium by passing through an intercellular space between the cells.

1. It differs from transcellular transport, where the substances travel through the cell passing through both the apical membrane and basolateral membrane
2. Renal physiology. Transcellular transport is more likely to involve energy expenditure than paracellular transport.
3. Capillaries of the blood–brain barrier have only transcellular transport, in contrast with normal capillaries, which have both transcellular and paracellular transport.
