= Net acid excretion =

Net amount of acid excreted in urine per unit time

In renal physiology, net acid excretion (NAE) is the net amount of acid excreted in the urine per unit time. Its value depends on urine flow rate, urine acid concentration, and the concentration of bicarbonate in the urine (the loss of bicarbonate, a buffering agent, is physiologically equivalent to a gain in acid). NAE is commonly expressed in units of milliliters per minute (ml/min) and is given by the following equation:

$\text{NAE} = V \times \Bigl( [\ce{NH_4}] + [\ce{TA}] - [\ce{HCO3-}] \Bigr)$

where

V is the volume of urine produced per unit time;
[NH_{4}] is the urine concentration of ammonium;
[TA] is the urine concentration of titratable acid (e.g. phosphoric acid, sulfuric acid);
[HCO^{−}_{3}] is the urine concentration of bicarbonate.

== Pathology ==
Increased net acid excretion is a compensation for respiratory acidosis, while decreased net acid excretion is a compensation for respiratory alkalosis.
