= Urea transporter 1 =

Protein-coding gene in the species Homo sapiens

SLC14A1

Identifiers
- Aliases: SLC14A1, HUT11, HsT1341, JK, RACH1, RACH2, UT-B1, UT1, UTE, solute carrier family 14 member 1 (Kidd blood group), Jk(b), HUT11A, Jk(a)
- External IDs: OMIM: 613868; MGI: 1351654; GeneCards: SLC14A1

Gene location (Human)
Chr.	Chromosome 18 (human)
Band	18q12.3	Start	45,687,025 bp
Band	18q12.3	End	45,752,520 bp

Gene location (Mouse)
Chr.	Chromosome 18 (mouse)
Band	18|18 E3	Start	78,143,306 bp
Band	18|18 E3	End	78,185,334 bp
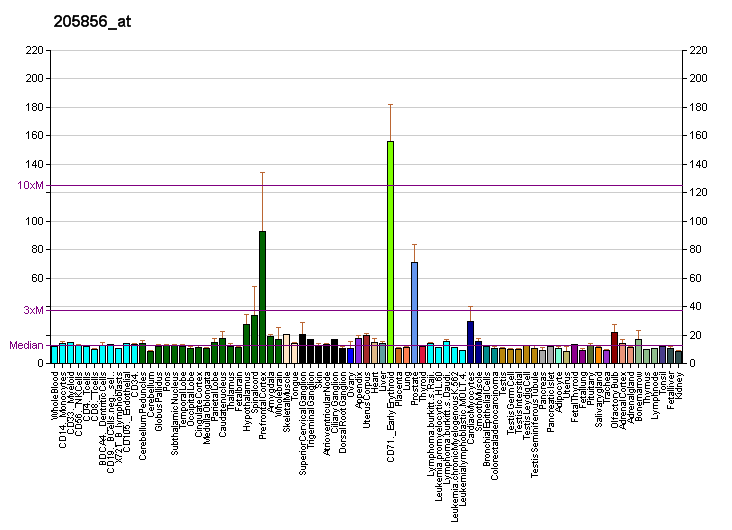
RNA expression pattern
Bgee	Human / Mouse (ortholog); Top expressed in: tibia; mucosa of urinary bladder; trabecular bone; right coronary artery; internal globus pallidus; ascending aorta; dorsal motor nucleus of vagus nerve; optic nerve; substantia nigra; prostate / Top expressed in: bone marrow; urinary bladder; male urethra; ovary; spleen; inner renal medulla; epithelium of male urethra; female urethra; renal vein; Transitional epithelium of renal pelvis; More reference expression data
BioGPS	More reference expression data
Gene ontology
Molecular function	water transmembrane transporter activity; urea channel activity; urea transmembrane transporter activity; protein binding
Cellular component	integral component of membrane; plasma membrane; basolateral plasma membrane; integral component of plasma membrane; nucleolus; intracellular membrane-bounded organelle; membrane
Biological process	water transport; urea transport; urea transmembrane transport; transmembrane transport
Sources:Amigo / QuickGO
Orthologs
Databases	NCBI: entry; OMA: entry
Species	Human	Mouse
Entrez	6563	108052
Ensembl	ENSG00000141469	ENSMUSG00000059336
UniProt	Q13336	Q8VHL0
RefSeq (mRNA)	NM_001128588; NM_001146036; NM_001146037; NM_001308278; NM_001308279 NM_015865	NM_001171010; NM_001171011; NM_028122
RefSeq (protein)	NP_001122060; NP_001139508; NP_001139509; NP_001295207; NP_001295208 NP_056949	NP_001164481; NP_001164482; NP_082398
Location (UCSC)	Chr 18: 45.69 – 45.75 Mb	Chr 18: 78.14 – 78.19 Mb
PubMed search
- Wikidata
View/Edit Human	View/Edit Mouse

Urea transporter 1 is a protein that in humans is encoded by the SLC14A1 gene.

== Function ==
The SLC14A1 codes for a urea transporter (UTB) that is expressed in erythrocytes and kidney. SLC14A2 and SLC14A1 constitute solute carrier family 14. UTB proteins constitute the Kidd antigen system.
