= Werner Kuhn (chemist) =

Swiss chemist (1899–1963)

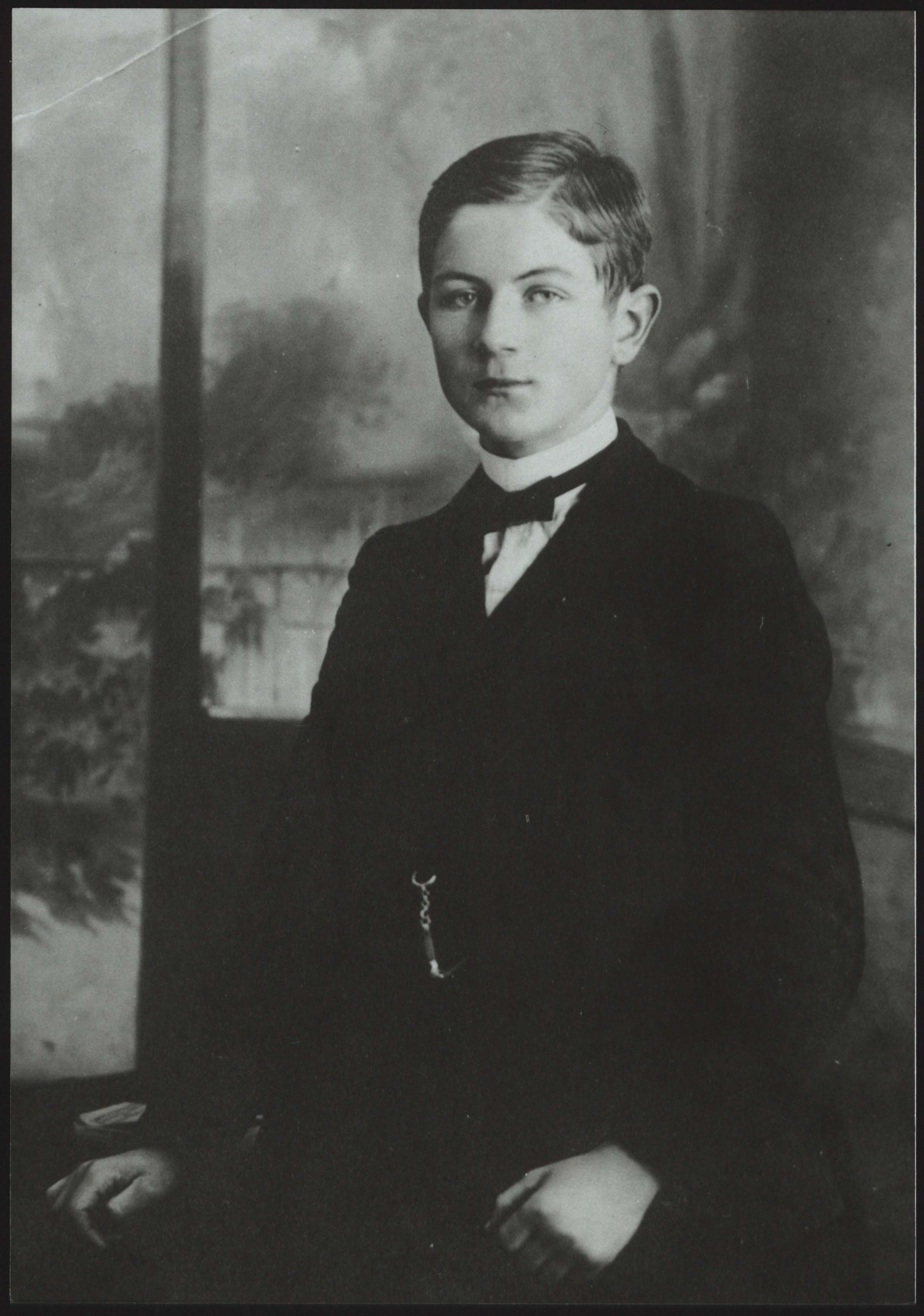
Werner Kuhn in 1916

Werner Kuhn (February 6, 1899 – August 27, 1963) was a Swiss physical chemist who developed the first model of the viscosity of polymer solutions using statistical mechanics. He is known for being the first to apply Boltzmann's entropy formula:

$$S = k \log W \!$$

to the modeling of rubber molecules, i.e. the "rubber band entropy model", molecules which he imagined as chains of N independently oriented links of length b with an end-to-end distance of r. This model, which resulted in the derivation of the thermal equation of state of rubber, has since been extrapolated to the entropic modeling of proteins and other conformational polymer chained molecules attached to a surface.

Kuhn received a degree in chemical engineering at the Eidgenössische Technische Hochschule (ETH, Federal Institute of Technology), in Zürich, and later a doctorate (1923) in physical chemistry. He was appointed professor of physical chemistry at the University of Kiel (1936–39) and then returned to Switzerland as director of the Physico-Chemical Institute of the University of Basel (1939–63), where he also served as rector (1955–56).

In 1929 Kuhn predicted the Mössbauer effect, 29 years before its discovery by Rudolf Mössbauer.

In a 1951 lecture along with his student V.B. Hargitay, he was the first to hypothesize the countercurrent multiplier mechanism in the mammalian kidney, later to be discovered in many other similar biological systems.

== See also ==
- Excluded volume
- Kuhn length
- Mark–Houwink equation
