= Countercurrent multiplication =

Mechanism creating a concentration gradient

A countercurrent mechanism system is a mechanism that expends energy to create a concentration gradient.

It is found widely in nature and especially in mammalian organs. For example, it can refer to the process that is underlying the process of urine concentration, that is, the production of hyperosmotic urine by the mammalian kidney. The ability to concentrate urine is also present in birds.

Countercurrent multiplication is frequently mistaken for countercurrent exchange, a similar but different mechanism where gradients are maintained, but not established.

== Physiological principles ==
The term derives from the form and function of the loop of Henle, which consists of two parallel limbs of renal tubules running in opposite directions, separated by the interstitial space of the renal medulla.

- The descending limb of the loop of Henle is permeable to water but impermeable to solutes, due to the presence of aquaporin 1 in its tubular wall. Thus, water moves across the tubular wall into the medullary space, making the filtrate hypertonic (with a lower water potential). This is the filtrate that continues to the ascending limb.
- The ascending limb is impermeable to water (because of a lack of aquaporin, a common transporter protein for water channels in all cells except the walls of the ascending limb of the loop of Henle) but permeable to solutes, but here Na^{+}, Cl^{−}, and K^{+} are actively transported into the medullary space, making the filtrate hypotonic (with a higher water potential). The interstitium is now "salty" or hypertonic, and will attract water as below. This constitutes the single effect of the countercurrent multiplication process.
- Active transport of these ions from the thick ascending limb creates an osmotic pressure drawing water from the descending limb into the hyperosmolar medullary space, making the filtrate hypertonic (with a lower water potential).
- The countercurrent flow within the descending and ascending limb thus increases, or multiplies the osmotic gradient between tubular fluid and interstitial space.

== Details ==
Countercurrent multiplication was originally studied as a mechanism whereby urine is concentrated in the nephron. Initially studied in the 1950s by Gottschalk and Mylle following Werner Kuhn's postulations, this mechanism gained popularity only after a series of complicated micropuncture experiments.

The proposed mechanism consists of pump, equilibration, and shift steps. In the proximal tubule, the osmolarity is isomolar to plasma (300 mOsm/L). In a hypothetical model where there was no equilibration or pump steps, the tubular fluid and interstitial osmolarity would be 300 mOsm/L as well.{Respicius Rwehumbiza, 2010}

Pump: The Na^{+}/K^{+}/2Cl^{−} transporter in the ascending limb of the loop of Henle helps to create a gradient by shifting Na^{+} into the medullary interstitium. The thick ascending limb of the loop of Henle lacks aquaporin on the apical membrane of its cells—a common transporter protein for water channels. This makes the thick ascending limb impermeable to water. The action of the Na^{+}/K^{+}/2Cl^{−} transporter therefore creates a hypoosmolar solution in the tubular fluid and a hyperosmolar fluid in the interstitium, since water cannot follow the solutes to produce osmotic equilibrium.

Equilibration: Since the descending limb of the loop of Henle consists of very leaky epithelium, the fluid inside the descending limb becomes hyperosmolar.

Shift: The movement of fluid through the tubules causes the hyperosmotic fluid to move further down the loop. Repeating many cycles causes fluid to be near isosmolar at the top of Henle's loop and very concentrated at the bottom of the loop. Animals with a need for very concentrated urine (such as desert animals) have very long loops of Henle to create a very large osmotic gradient. Animals that have abundant water on the other hand (such as beavers) have very short loops. The vasa recta have a similar loop shape so that the gradient does not dissipate into the plasma.

The mechanism of counter current multiplication works together with the vasa recta's counter current exchange to prevent the wash out of salts and maintain a high osmolarity at the inner medulla.
