= 1-Methylnicotinamide =

Ion

Names
- Preferred IUPAC name 3-Carbamoyl-1-methylpyridin-1-ium
- Other names Trigonellamide; N^{1}-Methylnicotinamide; NMN

Identifiers
CAS Number	3106-60-3; 1005-24-9(chloride)
3D model (JSmol)	Interactive image
ChEBI	CHEBI:16797
ChEMBL	ChEMBL71733
ChemSpider	444
DrugBank	DB11710
KEGG	C02918
PubChem CID	457
UNII	UM47085BXC
CompTox Dashboard (EPA)	DTXSID10185019
- InChI: InChI=1S/C7H8N2O/c1-9-4-2-3-6(5-9)7(8)10/h2-5H,1H3,(H-,8,10)/p+1 Key: LDHMAVIPBRSVRG-UHFFFAOYSA-O
- SMILES: C[N+]1=CC=CC(=C1)C(=O)N

Properties
Chemical formula	C_{7}H_{9}N_{2}O^{+}
Molar mass	137.161 g·mol^{−1}
- Except where otherwise noted, data are given for materials in their standard state (at 25 °C [77 °F], 100 kPa). Infobox references

1-Methylnicotinamide (1-MNA, trigonellamide) is a prototypic organic cation. 1-Methylnicotinamide is the methylated amide of nicotinic acid (vitamin B_{3}).

1-Methylnicotinamide is an endogenic substance that is produced in the liver when nicotinamide is metabolized. It is a typical substance secreted in the kidney. It participates in the nicotinamide salvage pathway within the NAD^{+} (nicotinamide adenine dinucleotide) metabolic pathway, thereby contributing to optimizing NAD^{+} levels.

== Occurrence ==
To date, the highest natural concentration of 1-methylnicotinamide has been found in the alga Undaria pinnatifida (3.2 mg/100 g of dried algae) and green tea leaves (3 mg/100 g of product). Other products with notable 1-MNA content include celery (1.6 mg/100 g of product), Chinese black mushrooms (shiitake, 1.3 mg/100 g), and fermented soybeans (natto, 1.0 mg/100 g).

== Biosynthesis ==
1-Methylnicotinamide can be produced in the liver by nicotinamide N-methyltransferase (NNMT). The reaction takes place during the metabolism of NAD^{+} (nicotinamide adenine dinucleotide). NNMT is also present in brain tissue, adipose tissue, muscle tissue, kidneys, and skin.

NNMT (nicotinamide N-methyltransferase) is an enzyme that in humans is encoded by the NNMT gene. NNMT catalyzes the methylation of nicotinamide and similar compounds using the methyl donor S-adenosyl methionine (SAM-e) to produce S-adenosyl-L-homocysteine (SAH) and 1-methylnicotinamide. NNMT is highly expressed in the human liver.

== Role in the body ==
Scientific research highlights numerous therapeutic and health-promoting properties of 1-MNA, including vascular protective, anticoagulant, anti-atherosclerotic, anti-inflammatory, neuroprotective, and endurance-enhancing effects.

=== Vascular protective effects ===
1-MNA exerts beneficial effects on blood vessels through its action on the vascular endothelium. It improves the bioavailability of nitric oxide (NO), which is crucial for vasodilation, and regulates the activity of endothelial nitric oxide synthase (eNOS), the enzyme responsible for NO synthesis.

These effects have been demonstrated in both in vivo and in vitro studies. Oral administration of 1-MNA has been shown to increase the diameter of the brachial artery (as measured by flow-mediated dilation, FMD) and stimulate NO release from human endothelial cells in both healthy individuals and those with hypercholesterolemia increased.

Additionally, in cases of vascular dysfunction (e.g., hypertriglyceridemia or diabetes), 1-MNA restored normal NO-dependent vasodilation. By increasing NO bioavailability, 1-MNA may counteract endothelial dysfunction, support endothelial regeneration, and improve vascular function, particularly in the context of cardiovascular risk.

=== Anticoagulant effects ===
1-Methylnicotinamide is an endogenous activator of prostacyclin synthesis and can therefore regulate thrombolytic and inflammatory processes in the cardiovascular system. It inhibits platelet-dependent thrombosis through a mechanism involving cyclooxygenase-2 and prostacyclin (PGI_{2}) and increases nitric oxide bioavailability in the endothelium. Endogenous prostacyclin (PGI_{2}) plays a critical role in preventing platelet aggregation and thrombus formation. A deficiency in PGI_{2} can lead to increased platelet aggregation and arterial thrombi.

=== Anti-atherosclerotic and anti-inflammatory effects ===
1-MNA exhibits anti-atherosclerotic and anti-inflammatory properties by improving the prostacyclin- and NO-dependent secretory function of the vascular endothelium, inhibiting platelet activation, reducing inflammation within atherosclerotic plaques, and lowering systemic inflammation and TNF-α levels.

The anti-inflammatory effects of 1-MNA are linked to its ability to stimulate endogenous PGI_{2} secretion and reduce IL-4 and TNF-α levels. These effects are mediated by endothelial mechanisms rather than a direct impact on immune cell function, ensuring that the body's immune response is not weakened.

=== NAD^{+} pptimization ===
1-MNA is an inhibitor of nicotinamide N-methyltransferase (NNMT). By inhibiting NNMT activity, it regulates NAD^{+} biosynthesis via the nicotinamide salvage pathway, the primary route for NAD^{+} synthesis in mammals. By participating in this pathway, 1-MNA optimizes NAD^{+} levels.

=== Impact on SIRT1 ===
Research published in Nature Medicine indicates that 1-MNA enhances SIRT1 expression and stability. SIRT1 is an enzyme associated with longevity.

Studies using the nematode Caenorhabditis elegans indicate that 1-MNA supplementation may extend lifespan. These studies also link 1-MNA to SIRT1.

=== Neuroprotective effects ===
Animal experiments with diabetic rats have shown that 1-methylnicotinamide positively effects degenerative changes in the brain, allowing cognitive performance to be maintained longer. It also prevents depressive behavior with efficacy comparable to the common antidepressant fluoxetine. This effect is attributed to the reduction of neuroinflammation, pro-inflammatory cytokines (IL-6, TNF-α), and increased expression of BDNF (brain-derived neurotrophic factor), a protein supporting neuron survival and growth.

The neuroprotective effects of 1-MNA involve shielding against neurotoxins, amyloid-beta plaques in the brain, neuroinflammatory responses, and neuronal apoptosis. It has been shown to improve memory deficits and cognitive functions, suggesting potential for treating neurodegenerative disorders.

=== Enhancement of physical performance ===
1-MNA acts as a myokine, supporting the utilization of amino acids for gluconeogenesis in the liver and stimulating lipolysis in adipose tissue, thereby providing energy for muscles. Studies indicate that 1-MNA supplementation improves exercise tolerance and reduces fatigue. After one month of supplementation with 58 mg of 1-MNA, post-COVID-19 patients reported improved distances in a 6-minute walk test (6MWT), with 92% of participants experiencing better outcomes compared to controls.

Additional studies highlight 1-MNA's ability to enhance physical performance by stimulating PGI_{2} release, protecting microcirculation, and ensuring adequate blood flow to muscle tissues. This mechanism may reduce cardiovascular risks associated with physical exertion, particularly in individuals with impaired endothelial response.

== Commercialization ==
1-MNA has been approved for use in food products in the form of 1-MNA chloride. The approval process in the European Union was successfully completed by PHARMENA SA. In 2017, the European Food Safety Authority (EFSA) confirmed the safety of 1-MNA chloride in food supplements, leading to its authorization in 2018 under EU Regulation 2018/1123.

1-MNA chloride is currently used in dietary supplements. Other chemical forms of 1-MNA are not currently allowed on the market as food.

== Safety ==
The safety of 1-MNA chloride has been thoroughly evaluated by EFSA, confirming its safe use. It must meet quality parameters defined in EU Regulation 2018/1123.
