= Paracellular transport =

Transfer of substances by passing through space between cells

Paracellular transport refers to the transfer of substances across an epithelium by passing through the intercellular space between the cells. It is in contrast to transcellular transport, where the substances travel through the cell, passing through both the apical membrane and basolateral membrane.

The distinction has particular significance in renal physiology and intestinal physiology. Transcellular transport often involves energy expenditure whereas paracellular transport is unmediated and passive down a concentration gradient, or by osmosis (for water) and solvent drag for solutes. Paracellular transport also has the benefit that absorption rate is matched to load because it has no transporters that can be saturated.

In most mammals, intestinal absorption of nutrients is thought to be dominated by transcellular transport, e.g., glucose is primarily absorbed via the SGLT1 transporter and other glucose transporters. Paracellular absorption therefore plays only a minor role in glucose absorption, although there is evidence that paracellular pathways become more available when nutrients are present in the intestinal lumen. In contrast, small flying vertebrates (small birds and bats) rely on the paracellular pathway for the majority of glucose absorption in the intestine. This has been hypothesized to compensate for an evolutionary pressure to reduce mass in flying animals, which resulted in a reduction in intestine size and faster transit time of food through the gut.

Capillaries of the blood–brain barrier have only transcellular transport, in contrast with normal capillaries which have both transcellular and paracellular transport.

The paracellular pathway of transport is also important for the absorption of drugs in the gastrointestinal tract. The paracellular pathway allows the permeation of hydrophilic molecules that are not able to permeate through the lipid membrane by the transcellular pathway of absorption. This is particularly important for hydrophilic pharmaceuticals, which may not have affinity for membrane-bound transporters, and therefore may be excluded from the transcellular pathway. The vast majority of drug molecules are transported through the transcellular pathway, and the few which rely on the paracellular pathway of transportation typically have a much lower bioavailability; for instance, levothyroxine has an oral bioavailability of 40 to 80%, and desmopressin of 0.16%.

== Structure of paracellular channels ==
Some claudins form tight junction-associated pores that allow paracellular ion transport.

The tight junctions have a net negative charge, and are believed to preferentially transport positively charged molecules. Tight junctions in the intestinal epithelium are also known to be size-selective, such that large molecules (with molecular radii greater than about 4.5 Å) are excluded. Larger molecules may also pass the intestinal epithelium via the paracellular pathway, although at a much slower rate and the mechanism of this transport via a "leak" pathway is unknown but may include transient breaks in the epithelial barrier.

Paracellular transport can be enhanced through the displacement of zona occludens proteins from the junctional complex by the use of permeation enhancers. Such enhancers include medium chain fatty acids (e.g. capric acid), chitosans, zona occludens toxin, etc.
