= Proximal tubule =

Segment of nephron in kidneys

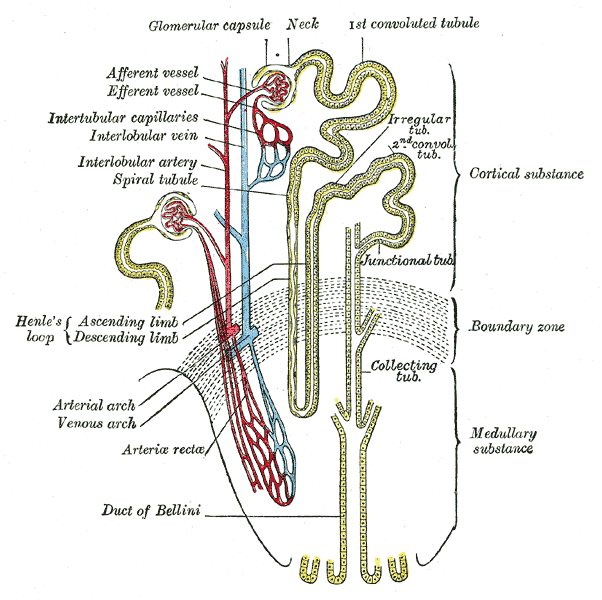
- Scheme of renal tubule and its vascular supply. (1st convoluted tubule labeled at center top.)

Details
- Precursor: Metanephric blastema

Identifiers
- Latin: tubulus proximalis, pars tubuli proximalis
- MeSH: D007687

The proximal tubule is the segment of the nephron in kidneys which begins from the renal (tubular) pole of the Bowman's capsule to the beginning of loop of Henle. At this location, the glomerular parietal epithelial cells (PECs) lining bowman's capsule abruptly transition to proximal tubule epithelial cells (PTECs). The proximal tubule can be further classified into the proximal convoluted tubule (PCT) and the proximal straight tubule (PST).

== Structure ==
The most distinctive characteristic of the proximal tubule is its luminal brush border.

=== Brush border cell ===
The luminal surface of the epithelial cells of this segment of the nephron is covered with densely packed microvilli forming a border readily visible under the light microscope giving the brush border cell its name. The microvilli greatly increase the luminal surface area of the cells, presumably facilitating their reabsorptive function as well as putative flow sensing within the lumen. The microvilli are composed of actin filament bundles that have been visualized using confocal microscopy.

The cytoplasm of the cells is densely packed with mitochondria, which are largely found in the basal region within the infoldings of the basal plasma membrane. The high quantity of mitochondria gives the cells an acidophilic appearance. The mitochondria are needed in order to supply the energy for the active transport of sodium ions out of the cells to create a concentration gradient which allows more sodium ions to enter the cell from the luminal side. Water passively follows the sodium out of the cell along its concentration gradient.

Cuboidal epithelial cells lining the proximal tubule have extensive lateral interdigitations between neighboring cells, which lend an appearance of having no discrete cell margins when viewed with a light microscope.

Agonal resorption of the proximal tubular contents after interruption of circulation in the capillaries surrounding the tubule often leads to disturbance of the cellular morphology of the proximal tubule cells, including the ejection of cell nuclei into the tubule lumen.

This has led some observers to describe the lumen of proximal tubules as occluded or "dirty-looking", in contrast to the "clean" appearance of distal tubules, which have quite different properties.

=== Divisions ===
Based on its appearance at low magnification, the proximal tubule can be divided into two sections: the proximal convoluted tubule (PCT), and the proximal straight tubule (PST). Differences in cell outlines exist between these segments, and therefore presumably in function too.

Based on ultrastructure, it can be divided into three segments, S1, S2, and S3.

Segment	Gross divisions	Ultrastructure divisions	Description
Proximal tubule	convoluted	S1	Higher cell complexity
Proximal tubule	convoluted	S2	
Proximal tubule	straight	S2	
Proximal tubule	straight	S3	Lower cell complexity

Proximal tubule cell showing pumps involved in acid base balance, left is the lumen of tubule

==== Proximal convoluted tubule (pars convoluta) ====
The pars convoluta (Latin "convoluted part") is the initial convoluted portion.

In relation to the morphology of the kidney as a whole, the convoluted segments of the proximal tubules are confined entirely to the renal cortex.

Some investigators on the basis of particular functional differences have divided the convoluted part into two segments designated S1 and S2.

==== Proximal straight tubule (pars recta) ====
The pars recta (Latin "straight part") is the following straight (descending) portion.

Straight segments descend into the outer medulla. They terminate at a remarkably uniform level and it is their line of termination that establishes the boundary between the inner and outer stripes of the outer zone of the renal medulla.

As a logical extension of the nomenclature described above, this segment is sometimes designated as S3.

== Functions ==
=== Absorption ===
The proximal tubule efficiently regulates the pH of the filtrate by secreting hydrogen ions (acid) into the tubule and reabsorbing approximately 80% of the filtered bicarbonate.

Fluid in the filtrate entering the proximal convoluted tubule is reabsorbed into the peritubular capillaries. This is driven by sodium transport from the lumen into the blood by the Na^{+}/K^{+}-ATPase in the basolateral membrane of the epithelial cells.

Sodium reabsorption is primarily driven by this P-type ATPase – 60–70% of the filtered sodium load is reabsorbed in the proximal tubule through active transport, solvent drag, and paracellular electrodiffusion. Active transport is mainly through the sodium/hydrogen antiporter NHE3. Paracellular transport increases transport efficiency, as determined by oxygen consumed per unit of Na^{+} reabsorbed, thus playing a part in maintaining renal oxygen homeostasis.

Substance	% of filtrate reabsorbed	Comments
water	approximately two-thirds	Mass movement of water and occurs both through the cells and between them, passively via aquaporins (transcellular transport) and between cells through tight junctions (paracellular).
sodium	approximately two-thirds	Mass movement of sodium occurs through the cells, by secondary active transport on the apical membrane, followed by active resorption across the basolateral membrane via the Na^{+}/K^{+}-ATPase. The solutes are absorbed isotonically, in that the osmotic potential of the fluid leaving the proximal tubule is the same as that of the initial glomerular filtrate.
organic solutes (primarily glucose and amino acids)	100%	Glucose, amino acids, inorganic phosphate, and some other solutes are resorbed via secondary active transport through co-transporters driven by the sodium gradient out of the nephron.
potassium	approximately 65%	Most of the filtered potassium is resorbed by two paracellular mechanisms – solvent drag and simple diffusion.
urea	approximately 50%	Paracellular fluid reabsorption sweeps some urea with it via solvent drag. As water leaves the lumen, the concentration of urea increases, which facilitates diffusion in the late proximal tubule.
phosphate	approximately 80%	Parathyroid hormone reduces reabsorption of phosphate in the proximal tubules, but, because it also enhances the uptake of phosphate from the intestine and bones into the blood, the responses to PTH cancel each other out, and the serum concentration of phosphate remains approximately the same.
citrate	70%–90%	Acidosis increases absorption. Alkalosis decreases absorption.

=== Secretion ===
Many types of medications are secreted in the proximal tubule. Further reading: Drugs secreted in the kidney

Most of the ammonium that is excreted in the urine is formed in the proximal tubule via the breakdown of glutamine to alpha-ketoglutarate. This takes place in two steps, each of which generates an ammonium anion: the conversion of glutamine to glutamate and the conversion of glutamate to alpha-ketoglutarate. The alpha-ketoglutarate generated in this process is then further broken down to form two bicarbonate anions, which are pumped out of the basolateral portion of the tubule cell by co-transport with sodium ions.

== Clinical significance ==
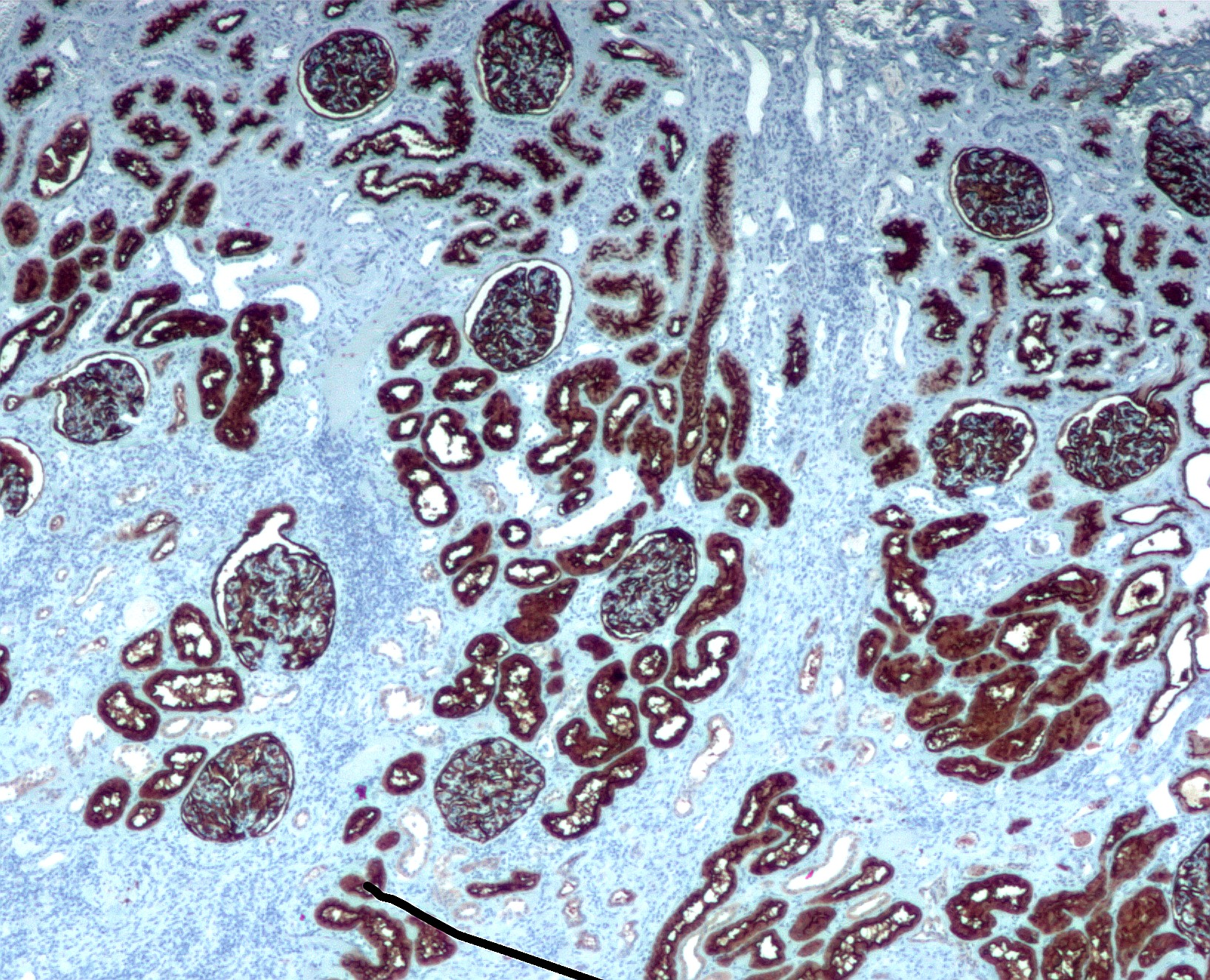
Immunohistochemical staining of the convoluted tubules and glomeruli with CD10

Proximal tubular epithelial cells (PTECs) have a pivotal role in kidney disease. Two mammalian cell lines are commonly used as models of the proximal tubule: porcine LLC-PK1 cells and marsupial OK cells.

=== Cancer ===
Most renal cell carcinoma, the most common form of kidney cancer, arises from the convoluted tubules.

=== Other ===
Acute tubular necrosis occurs when PTECs are directly damaged by toxins such as antibiotics (e.g., gentamicin), pigments (e.g., myoglobin) and sepsis (e.g., mediated by lipopolysaccharide from gram-negative bacteria). Renal tubular acidosis (proximal type) (Fanconi syndrome) occurs when the PTECs are unable to properly reabsorb glomerular filtrate so that there is increased loss of bicarbonate, glucose, amino acids, and phosphate.

PTECs also participate in the progression of tubulointerstitial injury due to glomerulonephritis, ischemia, interstitial nephritis, vascular injury, and diabetic nephropathy. In these situations, PTECs may be directly affected by protein (e.g., proteinuria in glomerulonephritis), glucose (in diabetes mellitus), or cytokines (e.g., interferon-γ and tumor necrosis factors). There are several ways in which PTECs may respond: producing cytokines, chemokines, and collagen; undergoing epithelial mesenchymal trans-differentiation; necrosis or apoptosis.

== See also ==
- Urinary pole
- Brush border
- List of distinct cell types in the adult human body

== Additional images ==
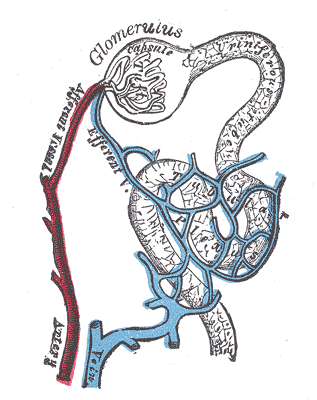
Distribution of blood vessels in cortex of kidney.

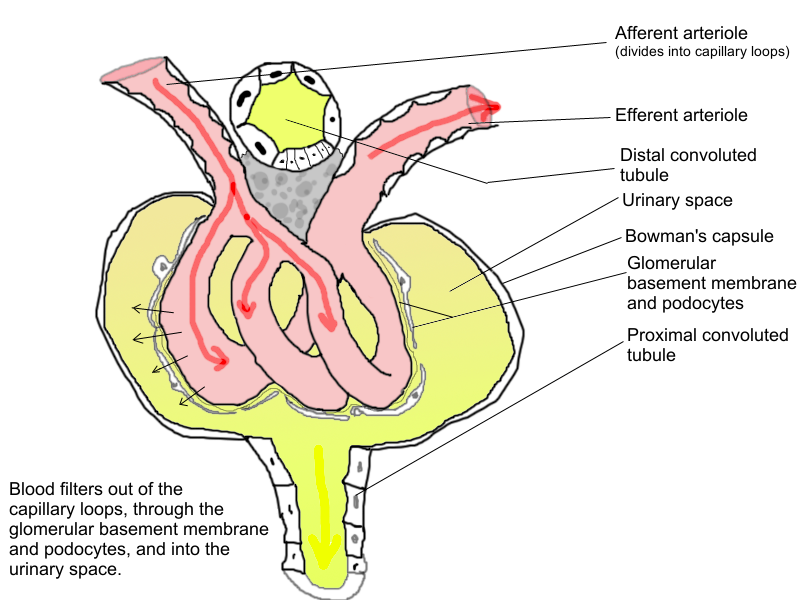
Glomerulus.

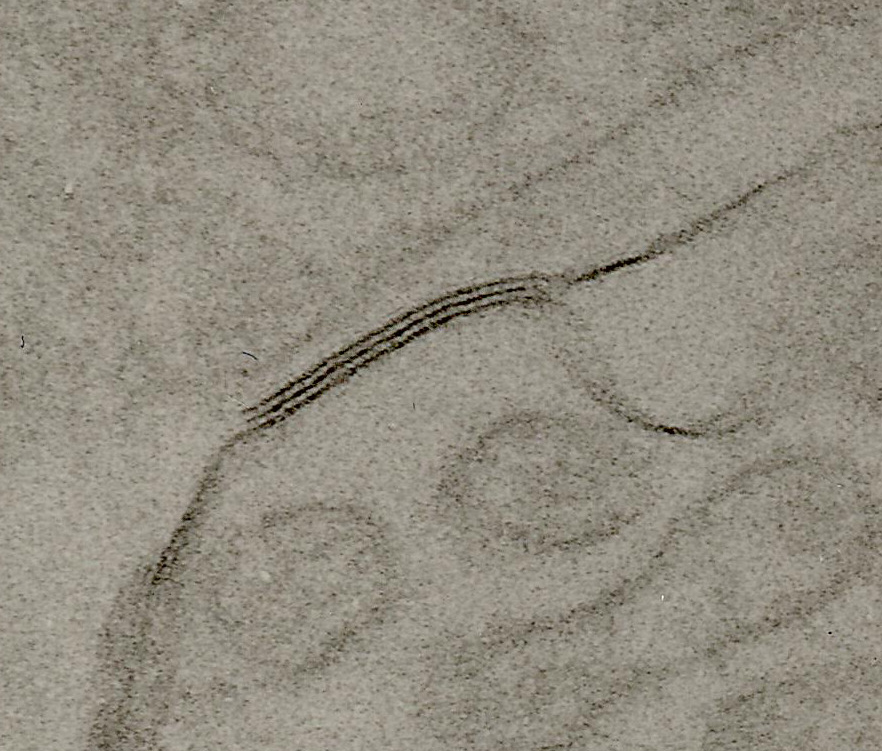
TEM of negatively stained proximal convoluted tubule of Rat kidney tissue at a magnification of ~55,000x and 80KV with Tight junction.

Renal corpuscle

Diagram outlining movement of ions in nephron.
