= Loop of Henle =

Part of kidney tissue

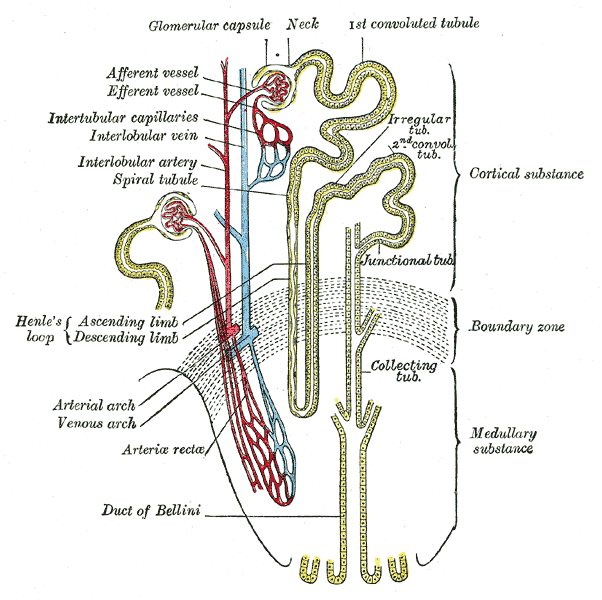
- Scheme of renal tubule and its vascular supply (loop of Henle visible center-left)

Details
- Precursor: Metanephrogenic blastema

Identifiers
- Latin: ansa nephroni
- MeSH: D008138
- FMA: 17718 17698, 17718

The loop of Henle (/ˈhɛnli/; also known as Henle's loop, Henle loop, nephron loop) is the portion of a nephron that leads from the proximal convoluted tubule to the distal convoluted tubule. Named after its discoverer, the German anatomist Friedrich Gustav Jakob Henle, the loop of Henle's main function is to create a concentration gradient in the medulla of the kidney.

By means of a countercurrent multiplier system, which uses electrolyte pumps, the loop of Henle creates an area of high urea concentration deep in the medulla, near the papillary duct in the collecting duct system. Water present in the filtrate in the papillary duct flows through aquaporin channels out of the duct, moving passively down its concentration gradient. This process reabsorbs water and creates a concentrated urine for excretion.

== Structure ==
The loop of Henle can be divided into four parts:

- Thin descending limb of loop of Henle

The thin descending limb has low permeability to ions and urea while being highly permeable to water. The loop has a sharp bend in the renal medulla going from descending to ascending thin limb.

- Thin ascending limb of loop of Henle

The thin ascending limb is impermeable to water, but it is permeable to ions.

- Ascending limb of loop of Henle

Sodium (Na^{+}), potassium (K^{+}) and chloride (Cl^{−}) ions are reabsorbed from the urine by secondary active transport by a Na–K–Cl cotransporter (NKCC2). The electrical and concentration gradient drives more reabsorption of Na^{+}, as well as other cations such as magnesium (Mg^{2+}) and calcium (Ca^{2+}).

- Cortical thick ascending limb

The cortical thick ascending limb drains urine into the distal convoluted tubule.

The tissue type of the loop is simple squamous epithelium. The "thick" and "thin" terminology does not refer to the size of the lumen, but to the size of the epithelial cells. The loop is also sometimes called the nephron loop.

=== Blood supply ===
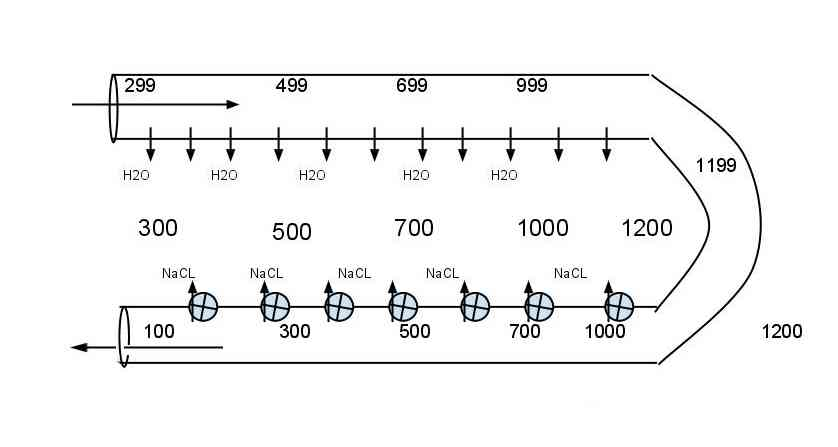
Counter current multiplier diagram

The loop of Henle is supplied by blood in a series of straight capillaries descending from the cortical efferent arterioles. These capillaries (called the vasa recta; recta is from the Latin for "straight") also have a countercurrent multiplier mechanism that prevents washout of solutes from the medulla, thereby maintaining the medullary concentration. As water is osmotically driven from the descending limb into the interstitium, it readily enters the capillaries. The low bloodflow through the vasa recta allows time for osmotic equilibration, and can be altered by changing the resistance of the vessels' efferent arterioles.

As well, blood in the vasa recta still has large proteins and ions which were not filtered through the glomerulus. This provides an oncotic pressure for ions to enter the vasa recta from the interstitium.

The main function of the loop of Henle is to absorb water and sodium chloride from the filtride which preserving water and produces highly concentrated urine.

== Physiology ==
The descending loop of Henle receives isotonic (300 mOsm/L) fluid from the proximal convoluted tubule (PCT). The fluid is isotonic because as ions are reabsorbed by the gradient time system, water is also reabsorbed maintaining the osmolarity of the fluid in the PCT. Substances reabsorbed in the PCT include urea, water, potassium, sodium, chloride, glucose, amino acids, lactate, phosphate, and bicarbonate. Since water is also reabsorbed the volume of fluid in the loop of Henle is less than the PCT, approximately one-third of the original volume.

The interstitium of the kidney increases in osmolarity outside as the loop of Henle descends from 600 mOsm/L in the outer medulla of the kidney to 1200 mOsm/L in the inner medulla. The descending portion of the loop of Henle is extremely permeable to water and is less permeable to ions, therefore water is easily reabsorbed here and solutes are not readily reabsorbed. The 300 mOsm/L fluid from the loop loses water to the higher concentration outside the loop and increases in tonicity until it reaches its maximum at the bottom of the loop. This area represents the highest concentration in the nephron, but the collecting duct can reach this same tonicity with maximum ADH effect.

The ascending limb of the loop of Henle receives an even lower volume of fluid and has different characteristics compared to the descending limb. In the ascending portion, the loop becomes impermeable to water and the cells of the loop actively reabsorb solutes from the luminal fluid; therefore water is not reabsorbed and ions are readily reabsorbed. As ions leave the lumen via the Na–K–Cl symporter and the Na–H antiporter, the concentration becomes more and more hypotonic until it reaches approximately 100–150 mOsm/L. The ascending limb is also called the diluting segment of the nephron because of its ability to dilute the fluid in the loop from 1200 mOsm/L to 100 mOsm/L.

Flow of the fluid through the entire loop of Henle is considered slow. As flow increases, the ability of the loop to maintain its osmolar gradient is reduced. The vasa recta (capillary loops) also have a slow flow as well. Increases in vasa recta flow wash away metabolites and cause the medulla to lose osmolarity as well. Increases in flow will disrupt the kidney's ability to form concentrated urine.

Overall the loop of Henle reabsorbs around 25% of filtered ions and 20% of the filtered water in a normal kidney. These ions are mostly Na^{+}, Cl^{−}, K^{+}, Ca^{2+} and HCO_{3}^{−}. The powering force is the Na/K-ATPase on the basolateral membrane which maintains the ion concentrations inside the cells. On the luminal membrane, Na enters the cells passively; using the Na–K–Cl symporter. Then the Na/K-ATPase will pump 3 Na out into the peritubular fluid and 2 K into the cell on the non-lumen side of the cell. This gives the lumen of the fluid in the loop a positive charge in comparison and creates a Na concentration gradient, which both push more Na into the cell via the Na–H antiporter. The hydrogen ion for the antiporter comes from the enzyme carbonic anhydrase, which takes water and carbon dioxide and forms bicarbonate and a hydrogen ion. The hydrogen ion is exchanged for the Na in the tubular fluid of the loop of Henle.

== Importance of loop of Henle length ==
While the physical shape of the loop of Henle is vital to the creation and maintenance of the medullary gradient, the length imposes a limit to the gradient. In other words, the length of the loop of Henle limits the concentration of the gradient, i.e., the longer the loop, the greater the osmotic gradient. Thus, longer loops would allow for steeper gradients and greater capacity to concentrate urine. Through the countercurrent multiplier the loop of Henle increases the osmolarity of the medulla.

The loop of Henle is always a U-shaped tubule, with a descending limb and an ascending limb, however its length varies among different vertebrates. This is associated with the fact that it has two functions; whilst the first is to clean wastes, the second is to maintain a balance between ions and H_{2}O. This allows to balance the blood pressure, blood pH and membrane potentials. To achieve such balance between water and ions, the loop of Henle coordinates its function with the collecting duct to regulate the amount of water to reabsorb or to excrete. While the loop of Henle makes the medulla of the kidney salty, the collecting duct regulates the permeability of water that could be reabsorbed to such salty environment. The saltier the medulla, the more water can be reabsorbed from the pre-urine in collecting duct; before it becomes urine. Aquaporin-2 (AQ2) sits in collecting duct and is selectively inserted into cell membranes, according to the body's needs, to reabsorb water to create that balance.

Vertebrates who live in the desert do not have access to lots of water. Therefore, some of them have a longer loop of Henle which creates a saltier medulla, leading them to reabsorb more water from the pre-urine. For example, the urine concentration in humans can be as concentrated as 1400 mOsm which is limited by the length of our loop of Henle, i.e., 2.2 mm. While a camel's loop of Henle, which is around 4.1 mm, can reach 2800 mOsm. Another example is the Australian mouse whose loop of Henle, 5.2 mm, can make the medulla as salty as 9000 mOsm. This permits that the urine of these rodents can reach 9000 mOsm, in other words, a highly concentrated urine.

== Additional images ==
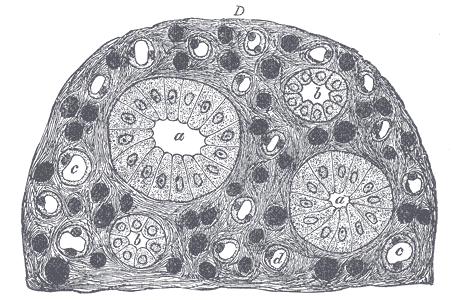
Transverse section of pyramidal substance of kidney of an adult pig, the bloodvessels of which are injected.

Diagram of physiological functions of nephron, including the loop of Henle.
