= Osmotic shock =

Shock caused by a sudden change in the solute concentration around a cell

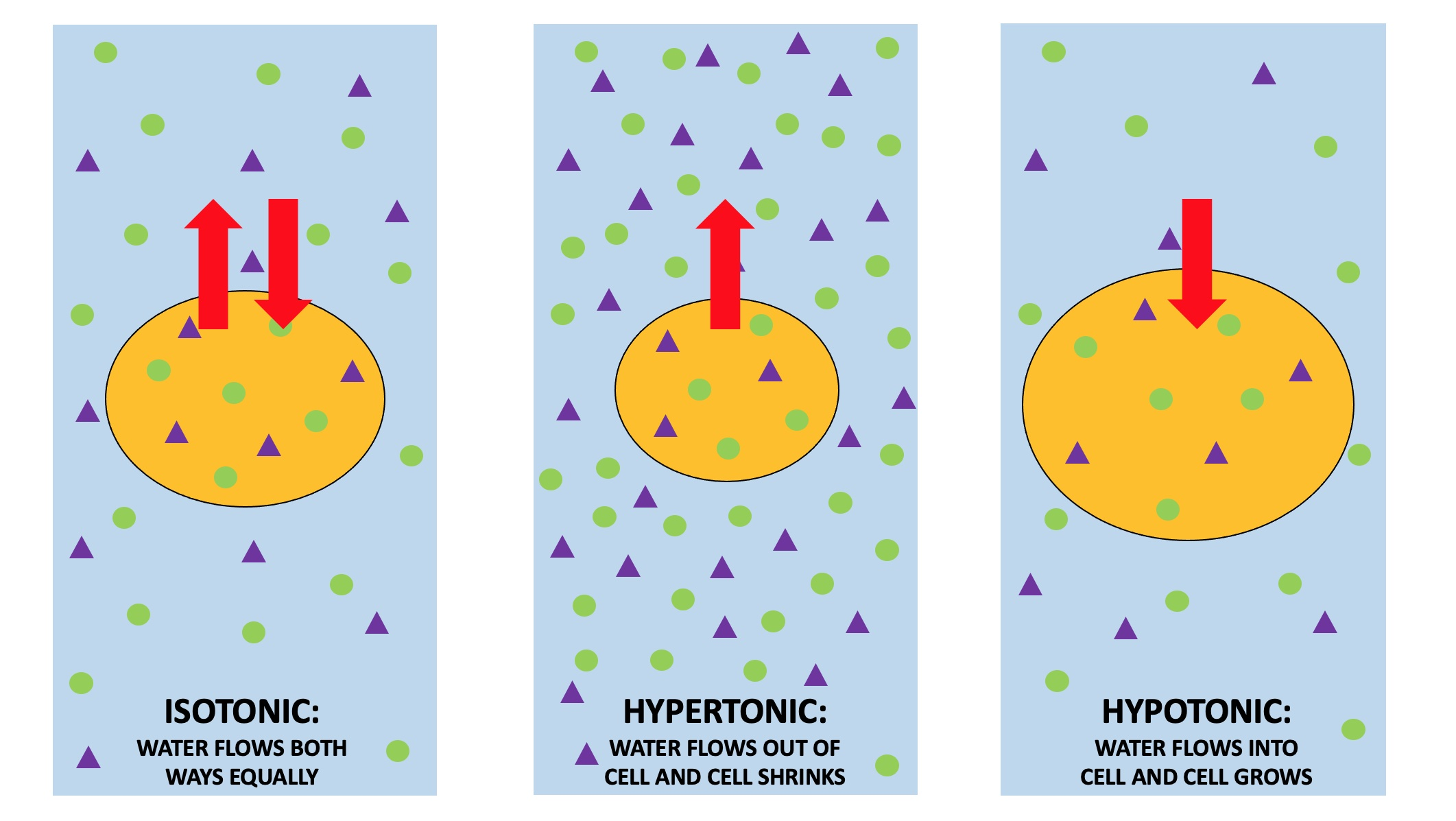
Tonicity concept related to the transport of water towards the more concentrated aqueous solution (osmotic transport): In isotonic solutions, water flows equally into and out of the cell (equilibrium). In hypertonic solutions water flows out of the cell and the cell shrinks (plasmolysis). In hypotonic solutions, water flows into the cell and the cell swells (turgescence).

Osmotic shock or osmotic stress is physiologic dysfunction caused by a sudden change in the solute concentration around a cell, which causes a rapid change in the movement of water across its cell membrane.

Under isotonic conditions, no net movement of water occurs. Under hypertonic conditions - conditions of high concentrations of either salts, substrates or any solute in the supernatant - water is drawn out of the cells through osmosis. This also inhibits the transport of substrates and cofactors into the cell thus “shocking” the cell. Alternatively, under hypotonic conditions - when concentrations of solutes are low - water enters the cell in large amounts, causing it to swell and either burst or undergo apoptosis.

All organisms have mechanisms to respond to osmotic shock, with sensors and signal transduction networks providing information to the cell about the osmolarity of its surroundings; these signals activate responses to deal with extreme conditions. Cells that have a cell wall tend to be more resistant to osmotic shock because their cell wall enables them to maintain their shape. Although single-celled organisms are more vulnerable to osmotic shock, since they are directly exposed to their environment, cells in large animals such as mammals still suffer these stresses under some conditions. Current research also suggests that osmotic stress in cells and tissues may significantly contribute to many human diseases.

In eukaryotes, calcium acts as one of the primary regulators of osmotic stress. Intracellular calcium levels rise during hypo-osmotic and hyper-osmotic stresses.

== Recovery and tolerance mechanisms ==
=== For hyper-osmotic stress ===
Calcium plays a large role in the recovery and tolerance for both hyper and hypo-osmotic stress situations. Under hyper-osmotic stress conditions, increased levels of intracellular calcium are exhibited. This may play a crucial role in the activation of second messenger pathways.

One example of a calcium activated second messenger molecule is MAP Kinase Hog-1. It is activated under hyper-osmotic stress conditions and is responsible for an increase in the production of glycerol within the cell succeeding osmotic stress. More specifically, it works by sending signals to the nucleus that activate genes responsible for glycerol production and uptake.

=== For hypo-osmotic stress ===
Hypo-osmotic stress recovery is largely mediated by the influx and efflux of several ions and molecules. Cell recovery after hypo-osmotic stress has shown to be consistent with an influx of extracellular Calcium. This influx of calcium may alter the cell's permeability.

Additionally, in some organisms the efflux of amino acids associated with hypo-osmotic stress can be inhibited by phenothiazines.

Hypo-osmotic stress is correlated with extracellular ATP release. ATP is used to activate purinergic receptors. These receptors regulate sodium and potassium levels on either side of the cell membrane.

== See also ==
- Osmolyte
- Myo-Inositol
- Taurine and Taurine-transporting ATPase
- Creatine
- Betaines
- Trimethylglycine – A Betaine and metabolite of Choline
- Sorbitol
- Glycerophosphocholine
