= Cytolysis =

Bursting of cells

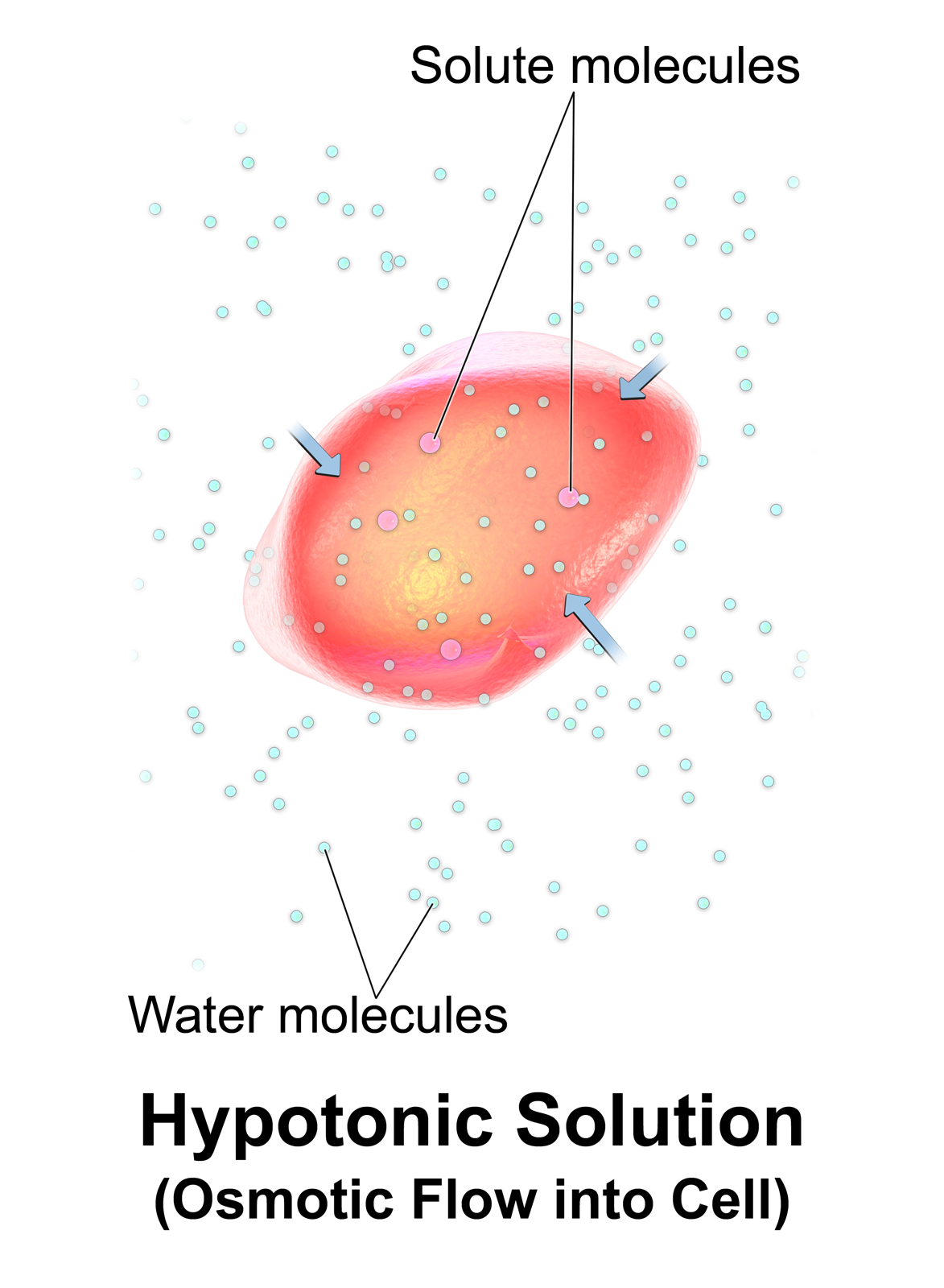
- A red blood cell in a hypotonic solution, causing water to move into the cell.
- Specialty: Cell biology
- Causes: Osmosis

Blood cells in solutions with different osmotic pressure. Cytolysis would result in the image on the far right.

Micrographs of osmotic pressure on red blood cells

A human white blood cell (upper right) in water swells until it bursts (at ~14 seconds)

Cytolysis, or osmotic lysis, occurs when a cell bursts due to an osmotic imbalance that has caused excess water to diffuse into the cell. Water can enter the cell by diffusion through the cell membrane or through selective membrane channels called aquaporins, which greatly facilitate the flow of water. It occurs in a hypotonic environment, where water moves into the cell by osmosis and causes its volume to increase to the point where the volume exceeds the membrane's capacity and the cell bursts. The presence of a cell wall prevents the membrane from bursting, so cytolysis only occurs in animal and protozoa cells which do not have cell walls. The reverse process is plasmolysis.

== In bacteria ==
Osmotic lysis would be expected to occur when bacterial cells are treated with a hypotonic solution with added lysozyme, which destroys the bacteria's cell walls.

== Prevention ==
Different cells and organisms have adapted different ways of preventing cytolysis from occurring. For example, the paramecium uses a contractile vacuole, which rapidly pumps out excessive water to prevent the build-up of water and the otherwise subsequent lysis.

== See also ==
- Cell disruption
- Crenation
- Lysis
- Osmotic pressure
- Plasmolysis
- Water intoxication
