= P-V curve =

P-V curve may refer to:

- Pressure-volume curves in ecology
- Pressure–volume diagram in physics and physiology
- Power-voltage curve in electrical engineering
