= Crenation =

Scalloped edging

Diagram of a crenated leaf

Crenation (from modern Latin crenatus meaning "scalloped or notched", from popular Latin crena meaning "notch") in botany and zoology, describes an object's shape, especially a leaf or shell, as being round-toothed or having a scalloped edge.

The descriptor can apply to objects of different types, including cells, where one mechanism of crenation is the contraction of a cell after exposure to a hypertonic solution, due to the loss of water through osmosis. In a hypertonic environment, the cell has a lower concentration of solutes than the surrounding extracellular fluid, and water diffuses out of the cell by osmosis, causing the cytoplasm to decrease in volume. As a result, the cell shrinks and the cell membrane develops abnormal notchings. Pickling cucumbers and salt-curing of meat are two practical applications of crenation.

Plasmolysis is the term which describes plant cells when the cytoplasm shrinks from the cell wall in a hypertonic environment. In plasmolysis, the cell wall stays intact, but the plasma membrane shrinks and the chloroplasts of the plant cell concentrate in the center of the cell.

== Red blood cells ==
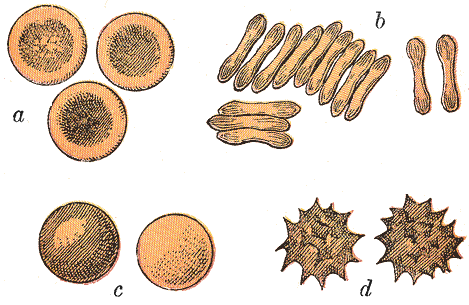
In (d) the RBCs are rendered crenated from a hypertonic solution

Crenation is also used to describe a feature of red blood cells. These erythrocytes look as if they have projections extending from a smaller central area, like a spiked ball. The crenations may be either large, irregular spicules of acanthocytes, or smaller, more numerous, regularly irregular projections of echinocytes. Acanthocytes and echinocytes may arise from abnormalities of the cell membrane lipids or proteins, or from other disease processes, or as an ex vivo artifact.

== See also ==
- Crenellation
- Cytorrhysis
- Hemolysis
- Plasmolysis
