= Cytorrhysis =

Permanent damage to the cell wall of a plant

Schematic of typical plant cell

Cytorrhysis is the permanent and irreparable damage to the cell wall after the complete collapse of a plant cell due to the loss of internal positive pressure (hydraulic turgor pressure). Positive pressure within a plant cell is required to maintain the upright structure of the cell wall. Desiccation (relative water content of less than or equal to 10%) resulting in cellular collapse occurs when the ability of the plant cell to regulate turgor pressure is compromised by environmental stress. Water continues to diffuse out of the cell after the point of zero turgor pressure, where internal cellular pressure is equal to the external atmospheric pressure, has been reached, generating negative pressure within the cell. That negative pressure pulls the center of the cell inward until the cell wall can no longer withstand the strain. The inward pressure causes the majority of the collapse to occur in the central region of the cell, pushing the organelles within the remaining cytoplasm against the cell walls. Unlike in plasmolysis (a phenomenon that does not occur in nature), the plasma membrane maintains its connections with the cell wall both during and after cellular collapse.

Cytorrhysis of plant cells can be induced in laboratory settings if they are placed in a hypertonic solution where the size of the solutes in the solution inhibit flow through the pores in the cell wall matrix. Polyethylene glycol is an example of a solute with a high molecular weight that is used to induce cytorrhysis under experimental conditions. Environmental stressors which can lead to occurrences of cytorrhysis in a natural setting include intense drought, freezing temperatures, and pathogens such as the rice blast fungus (Magnaporthe grisea).

== Mechanisms of avoidance ==
Desiccation tolerance refers to the ability of a cell to successfully rehydrate without irreparable damage to the cell wall following severe dehydration. Avoiding cellular damage due to metabolic, mechanical, and oxidative stresses associated with desiccation are obstacles that must be overcome in order to maintain desiccation tolerance. Many of the mechanisms utilized for drought tolerance are also utilized for desiccation tolerance, however the terms desiccation tolerance and drought tolerance should not be interchanged as the possession of one does not necessarily correlate with possession of the other. High desiccation tolerance is a trait typically observed in bryophytes, which includes the hornwort, liverwort and moss plant groups but it has also been observed in angiosperms to a lesser extent. Collectively these plants are known as resurrection plants.

== Resurrection plants ==
Many resurrection plants use constitutive and inducible mechanisms to deal with drought and then later desiccation stress. Protective proteins such as cyclophilins, dehydrins, and LEA proteins are maintained at levels within a desiccation resistant species typically only seen during drought stress for desiccation sensitive species, providing a greater protective buffer as inducible mechanisms are activated. Some species also continuously produce anthocyanins and other polyphenols. An increase in the hormone ABA is typically associated with activation of inducible metabolic pathways. Production of sugars (predominantly sucrose), aldehyde dehydrogenases, heat shock factors, and other LEA proteins are upregulated after activation to further stabilize cellular structures and function. Composition of the cell wall structure is altered to increase flexibility so folding can take place without irreparably damaging the structure of the cell wall. Sugars are utilized as water substitutes by maintaining hydrogen bonds within the cell membrane. Photosynthesis is shut down to limit production of reactive oxygen species and then eventually all metabolic are drastically reduced, the cell effectively becoming dormant until rehydration.
