= Per Fredrik Scholander =

Swedish-born Norwegian-American physiologist

- Scholander working in a laboratory at Scripps Institution of Oceanography, circa 1965–1975
- Born: Per Fredrik Thorkelsson Scholander; 29 November 1905; Örebro, Sweden
- Died: 13 June 1980 (aged 74); La Jolla, California, United States
- Education: University of Oslo
- Known for: Diving physiology; cold adaptation; plant water relations; Scholander pressure bomb
- Spouse: Susan Irving
- Scientific career
- Fields: Physiology, comparative physiology, plant physiology
- Workplaces: University of Oslo; Swarthmore College; Harvard Medical School; Woods Hole Oceanographic Institution; Scripps Institution of Oceanography

Per Fredrik Thorkelsson Scholander (29 November 1905 – 13 June 1980), usually published as P. F. Scholander, was a Swedish-born physiologist who studied and worked in Norway and later in the United States. He is known for work in comparative physiology, physiological ecology, diving physiology, cold adaptation and plant water relations. His research ranged from Arctic lichens and diving mammals to fish swim bladders, mangroves, osmosis, and the ascent of sap in trees. In plant physiology, he is known for the Scholander pressure bomb, a pressure chamber for measuring xylem water tension.

Scholander held appointments at the University of Oslo, Swarthmore College, Harvard Medical School, Woods Hole Oceanographic Institution, and the Scripps Institution of Oceanography. At Scripps he directed the Physiological Research Laboratory and promoted the research vessel Alpha Helix as a seagoing laboratory for experimental biology. He was elected to the American Academy of Arts and Sciences in 1959 and the National Academy of Sciences in 1961.

== Early life and education ==
Scholander was born in Örebro, Sweden, on 29 November 1905, to Thorkel Fredrik Scholander and Agnete Faye-Hansen. He studied medicine at the University of Oslo where he received an M.D. in 1932 and a Dr. Philos. in botany in 1934. During his student years he joined Arctic botanical expeditions to Greenland and Spitsbergen, where he collected plants and lichens.

== Career ==
Scholander went to the United States as a Rockefeller Fellow in 1939 and worked at Swarthmore College with the physiologist Laurence Irving. During the Second World War he served in the United States Army Air Forces, where he and Irving worked on aviation physiology, survival equipment, and field survival problems. After the war he returned to Swarthmore, then held appointments at Harvard Medical School and the Woods Hole Oceanographic Institution. He was professor of zoophysiology at the University of Oslo from 1955 to 1958 before moving to Scripps Institution of Oceanography, where he spent the remainder of his career.

At Scripps, Scholander was professor of physiology from 1958 to 1973 and emeritus professor from 1973 until his death. He also served as director of the Physiological Research Laboratory from 1963 to 1970.

== Research ==
=== Diving physiology ===
Scholander's early physiological research examined how diving mammals and birds tolerate prolonged submergence. His 1940 monograph, Experimental Investigations on the Respiratory Function in Diving Mammals and Birds, became one of the principal early works in modern diving physiology. Scholander and collaborators studied the respiratory and circulatory adjustments of seals and other diving animals, including the use of blood and muscle oxygen stores and the reduction of circulation to less essential tissues during dives.

=== Cold adaptation and ecological physiology ===
Scholander studied temperature regulation and cold adaptation in Arctic animals and humans. His work included comparative studies of polar birds and mammals, human cold acclimation, freezing survival in Arctic organisms, and the avoidance of freezing in polar fish.

=== Plant water relations ===
Scholander also made influential contributions to plant physiology. With H. T. Hammel, E. D. Bradstreet, and E. A. Hemmingsen, he published the 1965 Science article "Sap Pressure in Vascular Plants", which described the pressure chamber method for measuring negative hydrostatic pressure in the xylem of vascular plants. The instrument became widely known as the Scholander pressure chamber or Scholander pressure bomb. The paper reported negative sap pressures in transpiring plants and provided experimental support for the cohesion-tension explanation of water movement in trees. His plant work also included studies of sap ascent in tall trees, water relations in lianas, and the salt balance of mangroves.

=== Instrumentation ===
Scholander was known for designing simple instruments and methods for physiological measurement. In addition to the pressure chamber for measuring water tension in plants, his bibliography includes work on respiratory gas analysis, blood gas measurement, small-volume respiration methods, and other methods used in comparative physiology.

== Scripps Institution and Alpha Helix ==
At Scripps, Scholander helped develop Alpha Helix, a research vessel intended as a floating laboratory with modern laboratory space and a machine shop. The ship's first voyage was in 1966 to the Great Barrier Reef, followed by expeditions to the Amazon, the Galápagos Islands, the Bering Sea, Antarctica, New Guinea, and other locations.

== Honors ==
Scholander's honors included election to the American Academy of Arts and Sciences in 1959, the National Academy of Sciences in 1961, and the American Philosophical Society in 1962. He was also elected to the Norwegian Academy of Science and Letters and the Royal Swedish Academy of Sciences, received honorary doctorates from the University of Alaska and Uppsala University, and received the Fridtjof Nansen Prize in Oslo in 1979.

== Personal life and death ==
In 1951 Scholander married Susan Irving, daughter of Laurence Irving who was Scholander's longtime collaborator. He died at his home in La Jolla, California, on 13 June 1980, aged 74.

== Selected publications ==
- Scholander, P. F. (1940). Experimental Investigations on the Respiratory Function in Diving Mammals and Birds. Hvalradets Skrifter, no. 22.
- Scholander, P. F.; Hammel, H. T.; Bradstreet, E. D.; Hemmingsen, E. A. (1965). "Sap Pressure in Vascular Plants: Negative hydrostatic pressure can be measured in plants". Science. 148 (3668): 339-346. doi:10.1126/science.148.3668.339.
- Scholander, P. F. (1978). "Rhapsody in Science". Annual Review of Physiology. 40: 1-17. doi:10.1146/annurev.ph.40.030178.000245.
