= Plasmolysis =

Process by which cells lose water in a hypertonic solution

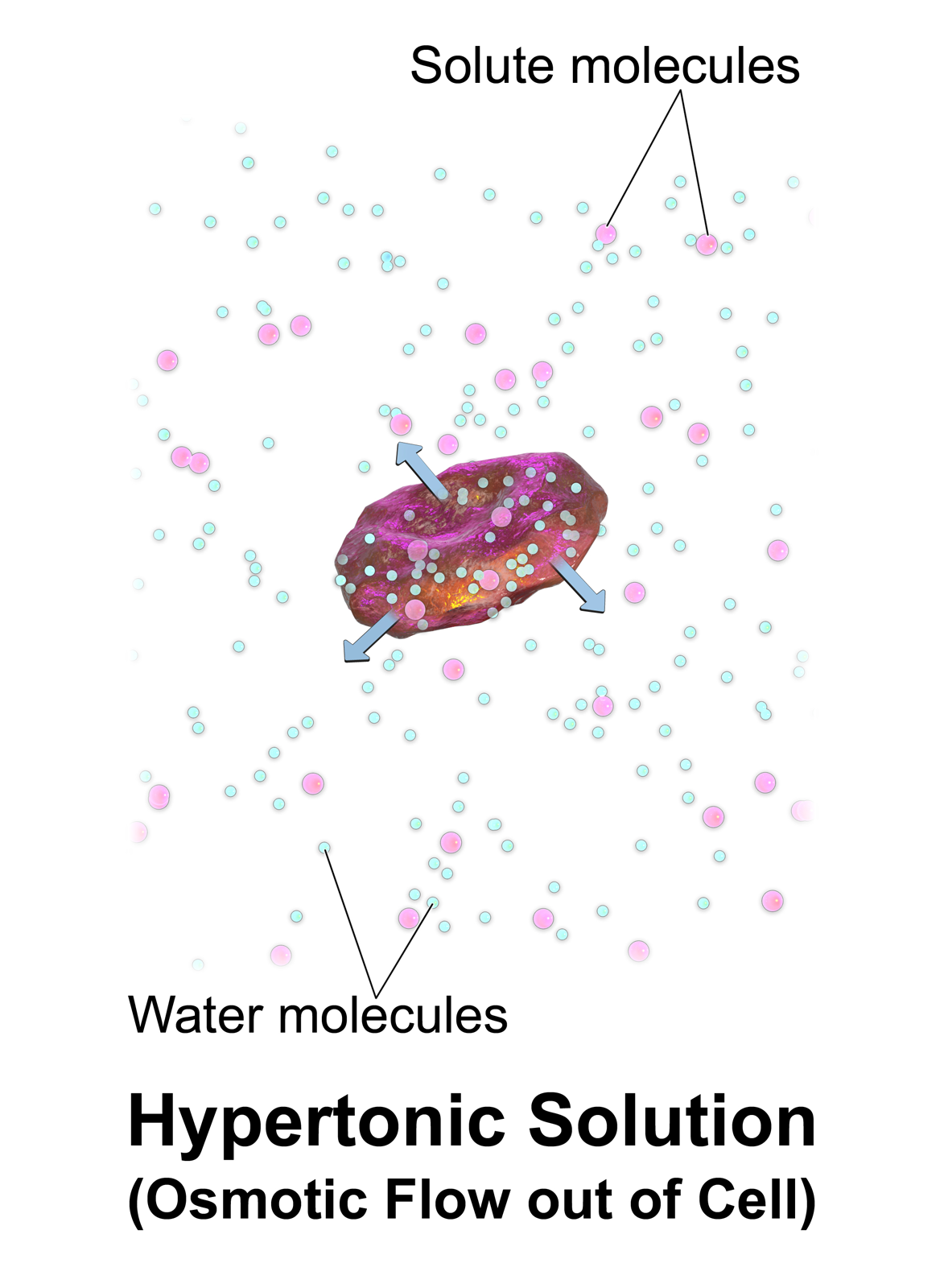
- A red blood cell in a hypertonic solution, causing water to move out of the cell.
- Specialty: Cell biology
- Causes: Osmosis

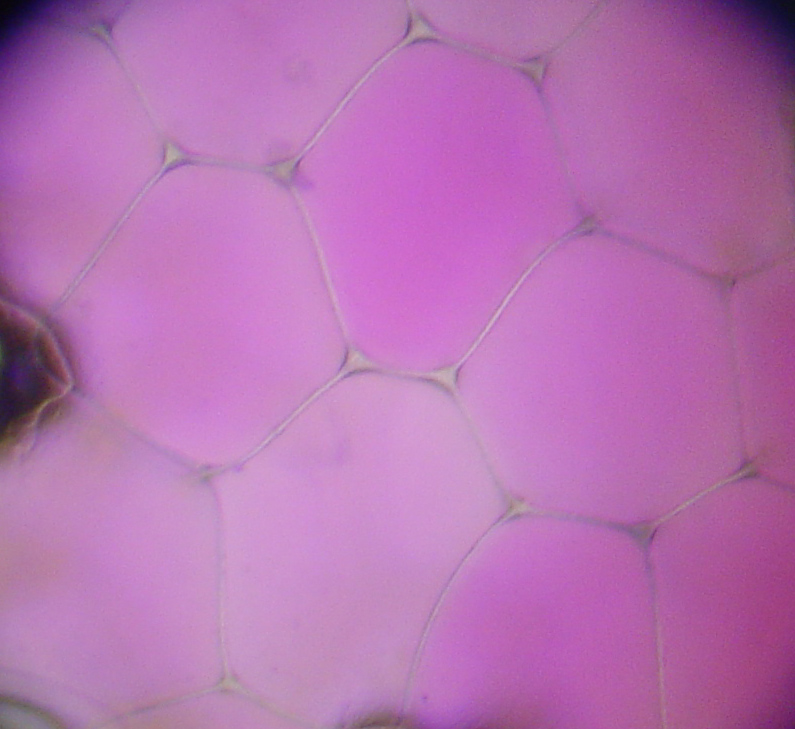

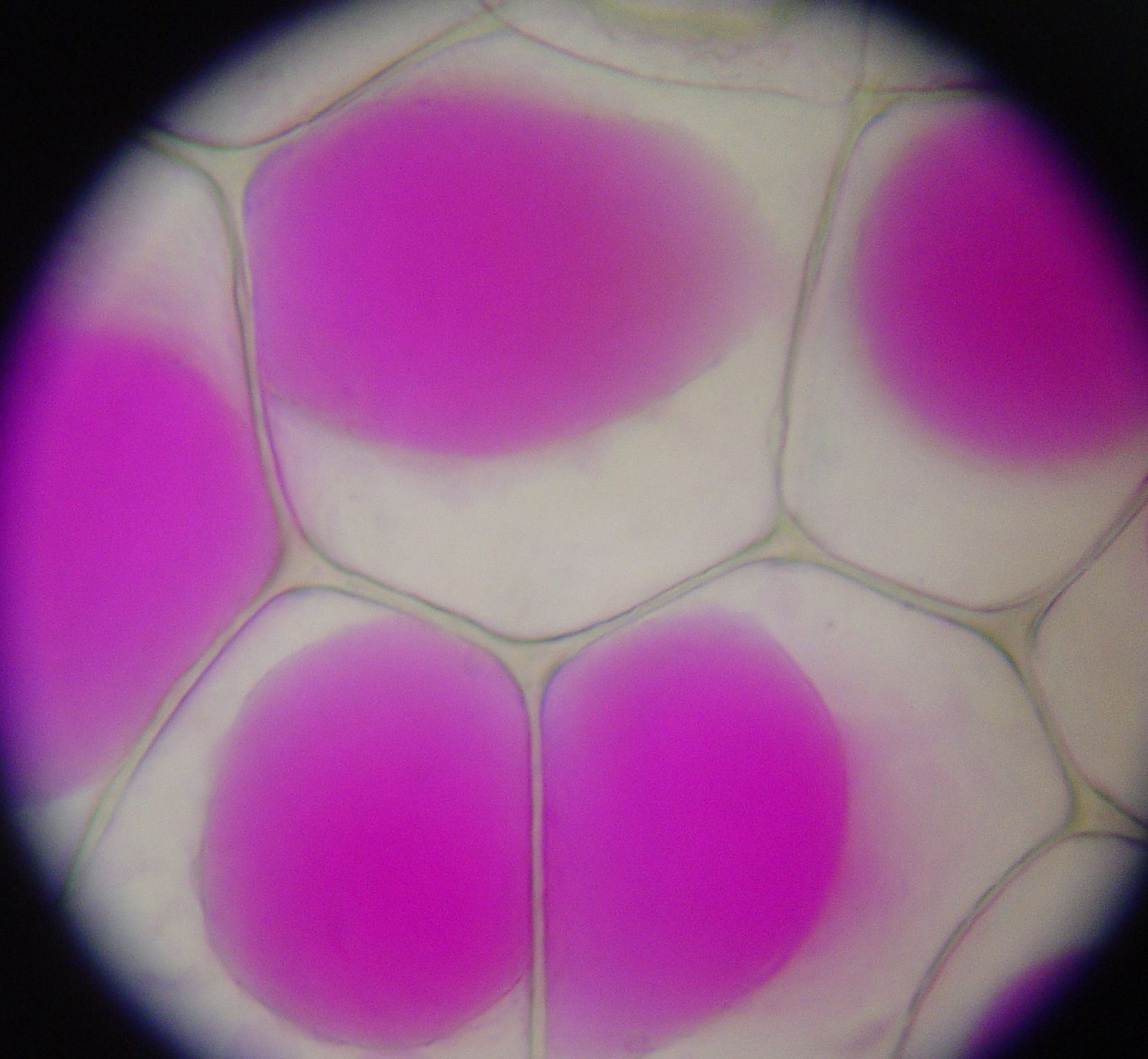
Before plasmolysis (top) and after (bottom)

Plasmolysis is the process in which cells lose water in a hypertonic solution. The reverse process, deplasmolysis or cytolysis, can occur if the cell is in a hypotonic solution resulting in a lower external osmotic pressure and a net flow of water into the cell. Through observation of plasmolysis and deplasmolysis, it is possible to determine the tonicity of the cell's environment as well as the rate solute molecules cross the cellular membrane.

== Etymology ==
The term plasmolysis is derived from the Latin word ‘plasma’ meaning ‘matrix’ and the Greek word ‘lysis’, meaning ‘loosening’.

== Turgidity ==
A plant cell in hypotonic solution will absorb water by endosmosis, so that the increased volume of water in the cell will increase pressure, making the protoplasm push against the cell wall, a condition known as turgor. Turgor makes plant cells push against each other in the same way and is the main line method of support in non-woody plant tissue. Plant cell walls resist further water entry after a certain point, known as full turgor, which stops plant cells from bursting as animal cells do in the same conditions. This is also the reason that plants stand upright. Without the stiffness of the plant cells the plant would fall under its own weight. Turgor pressure allows plants to stay firm and erect, and plants without turgor pressure (known as flaccid) wilt. A cell will begin to decline in turgor pressure only when there is no air spaces surrounding it and eventually leads to a greater osmotic pressure than that of the cell. Vacuoles play a role in turgor pressure when water leaves the cell due to hyperosmotic solutions containing solutes such as mannitol, sorbitol, and sucrose.

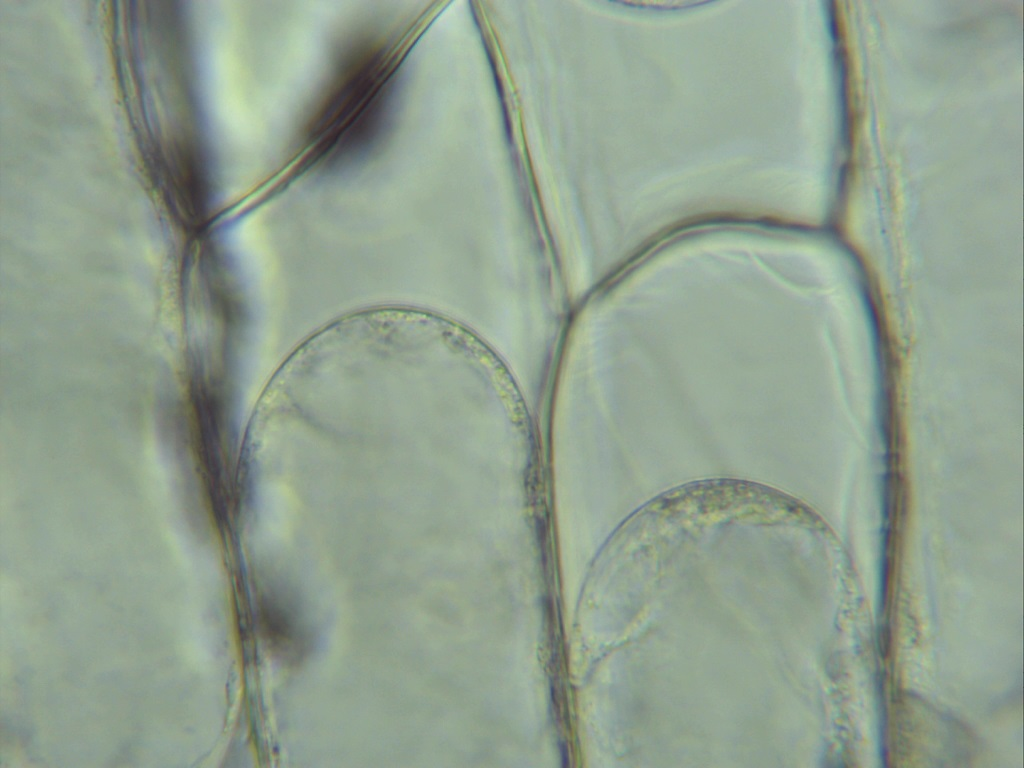
Plant cell undergoing Plasmolysis in a Hypertonic solution (x400 magnification)

== Plasmolysis ==
Plant cell under different environments

Once a plant cell is placed in a hypertonic solution, the plant cell loses water and hence turgor pressure by plasmolysis: pressure decreases to the point where the protoplasm of the cell peels away from the cell wall, leaving gaps between the cell wall and the membrane and making the plant cell shrink and crumple. A continued decrease in pressure eventually leads to cytorrhysis – the complete collapse of the cell wall. Plants with cells in this condition wilt. After plasmolysis the gap between the cell wall and the cell membrane in a plant cell is filled with hypertonic solution. This is because as the solution surrounding the cell is hypertonic, exosmosis takes place and the space between the cell wall and cytoplasm is filled with solutes, as most of the water drains away and hence the concentration inside the cell becomes more hypertonic. There are some mechanisms in plants to prevent excess water loss in the same way as excess water gain. Plasmolysis can be reversed if the cell is placed in a hypotonic solution. Stomata close to help keep water in the plant so it does not dry out. Wax also keeps water in the plant. The equivalent process in animal cells is called crenation.

The liquid content of the cell leaks out due to exosmosis. The cell collapses, and the cell membrane pulls away from the cell wall (in plants). Most animal cells consist of only a phospholipid bilayer (plasma membrane) and not a cell wall, therefore shrinking up under such conditions.

Plasmolysis only occurs in extreme conditions and rarely occurs in nature. It is induced in the laboratory by immersing cells in strong saline or sugar (sucrose) solutions to cause exosmosis, often using Elodea plants or onion epidermal cells, which have colored cell sap so that the process is clearly visible. Methylene blue can be used to stain plant cells.

Plasmolysis is mainly known as shrinking of cell membrane in hypertonic solution and great pressure.

Plasmolysis can be of two types, either concave plasmolysis or convex plasmolysis. During concave plasmolysis, the plasma membrane and the enclosed protoplast partially shrinks from the cell wall due to half-spherical, inwarding curving pockets forming between the plasma membrane and the cell wall. During convex plasmolysis, the plasma membrane and the enclosed protoplast shrinks completely from the cell wall, with the plasma membrane's ends in a symmetrically, spherically curved pattern.
