= Laurence Irving =

Laurence Irving may refer to:

- Laurence Irving (dramatist) (1871–1914), English actor, dramatist and novelist
- Laurence Irving (physiologist) (1895–1979), American physiologist
- Laurence Irving (set designer) (1897–1988), English set designer, nephew of the dramatist

== See also ==
- J. Lawrence Irving (born 1935), U.S. federal judge
