= Scholander pressure bomb =

Instrument for measuring water potential of plant tissue

A diagram showing the setup of a Pressure bomb

A pressure bomb, pressure chamber, or Scholander bomb is an instrument that can measure the approximate water potential of plant tissues. A leaf and petiole or stem segment is placed inside a sealed chamber. Pressurized gas (normally compressed nitrogen) is slowly added to the chamber. As the pressure increases, at some point the liquid contents of the sample will be forced out of the xylem and will be visible at the cut end of the stem or petiole. The pressure that is required to do so is equal and opposite to the water potential of the sample (Ψ_{leaf} or Ψ_{total}). Pressure bombs are field portable and mechanically simple, which make them the predominant method for water potential measurements in the fields of plant physiology and ecophysiology. The device was first conceived by Per Fredrik Scholander in 1965.

== Measurements ==
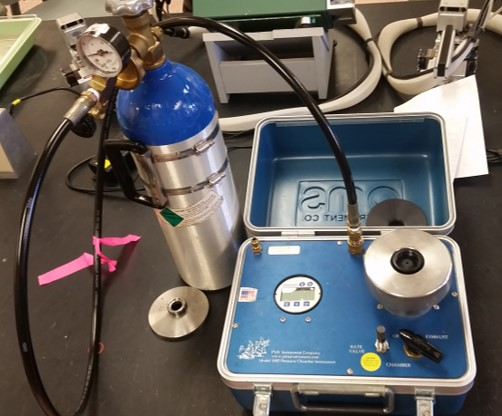
Self-contained pressure bomb

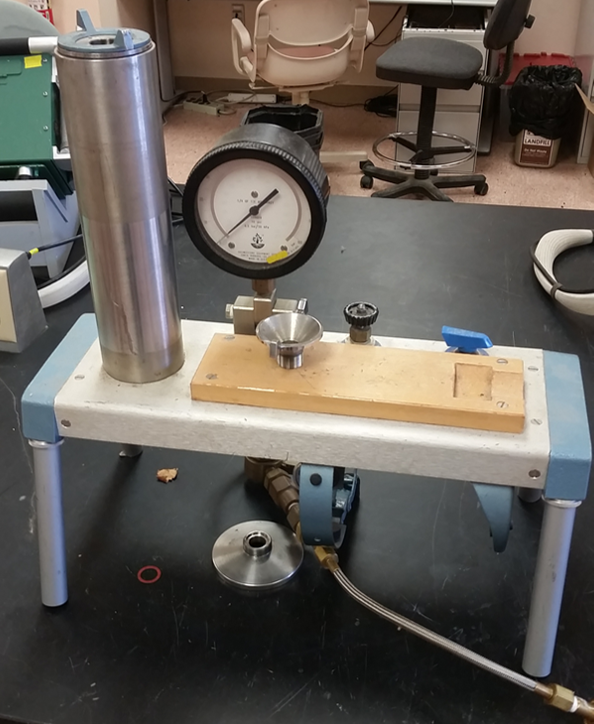
Pressure bomb with cutting board and larger canister

Several water potential variables can be determined using the pressure bomb analysis. The most common of which are predawn leaf water potential and midday leaf water potential. Measurements conducted on plants predawn are considered a good representation of the total water status of plant. As no transpiration through stomata should be occurring at night, the plant's water potentials should be in equilibrium across the entire plant and be similar to the water potential of the soil around the roots. Midday leaf water potential is less commonly used as it is more variable and does not correlate well with other physiological measurements of water status. However, midday water potentials can be used to determine times of peak water stress or diurnal changes in plant water status. Additional variables and methods that involve pressure bombs for analysis include: stem conductance, xylem embolisms, and vulnerability curves.

== Pressure-volume Curves ==
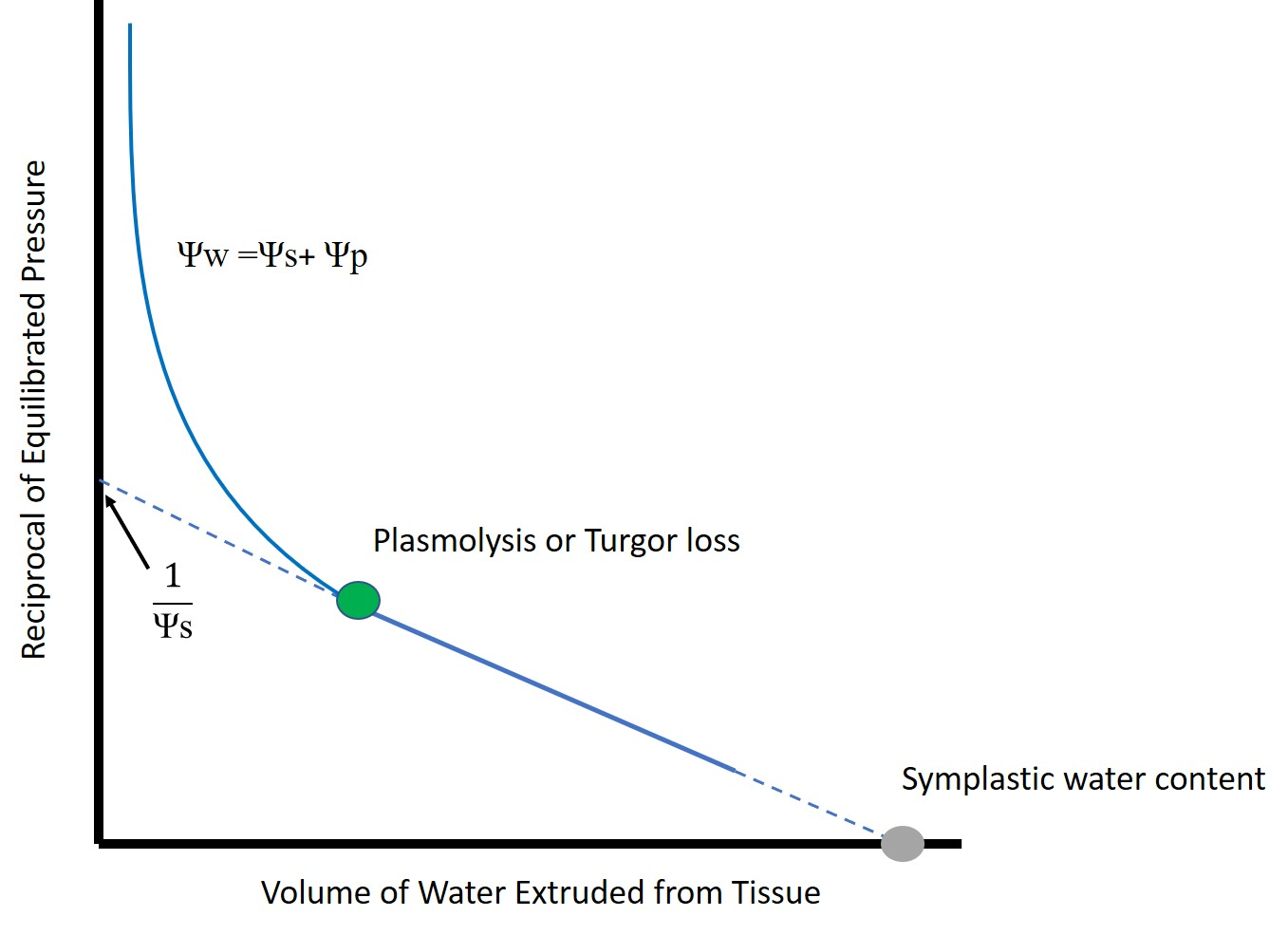
Simplified Pressure-Volume Curve

A more advance method that uses the pressure bomb in plant physiology is pressure-volume curves analysis or p-v curve. Through this method one measures the changes in leaf or stem water potential and relative water content to isolate the underlying components of total leaf or stem water potential. While the measurements can be time intensive, variable such as solute potential (Ψ_{s}), turgor loss point (Ψ_{tlp}), apoplastic water content and symplastic water content can all be determined using this method. The general protocol for measuring p-v curves involves repeated measure of water potential and mass in succession. As water is forced out of the sample with each measurement in the pressure bomb the mass is also reduced. Tracking these changes over many measurements should show a precipitous drop and then a steady linear decline after an inflection point.
