= Pressure-volume curves =

Relationship between water potential and relative water content

In ecology, pressure-volume curves describe the relationship between total water potential (Ψt) and relative water content (R) of living organisms. These values are widely used in research on plant-water relations and provide valuable information on the turgor, osmotic and elastic properties of plant tissues.

According to the Boyle–v'ant Hoff Relation, the product of osmotic potential and volume of solution should be a constant for any given amount of osmotically active solutes in an ideal osmotic system.

$\psi_0\mathit(V)\!$ = A constant

$\psi_0\!$ is osmotic potential and $\mathit(V)\!$ is volume of solution.

This can then be manipulated to a linear relation which describes the ideal situation:

$\psi_0\!$ = $\dfrac{1}V\! \times$ A constant
