= Bonaventura Corti =

Italian naturalist and priest (1729–1813)

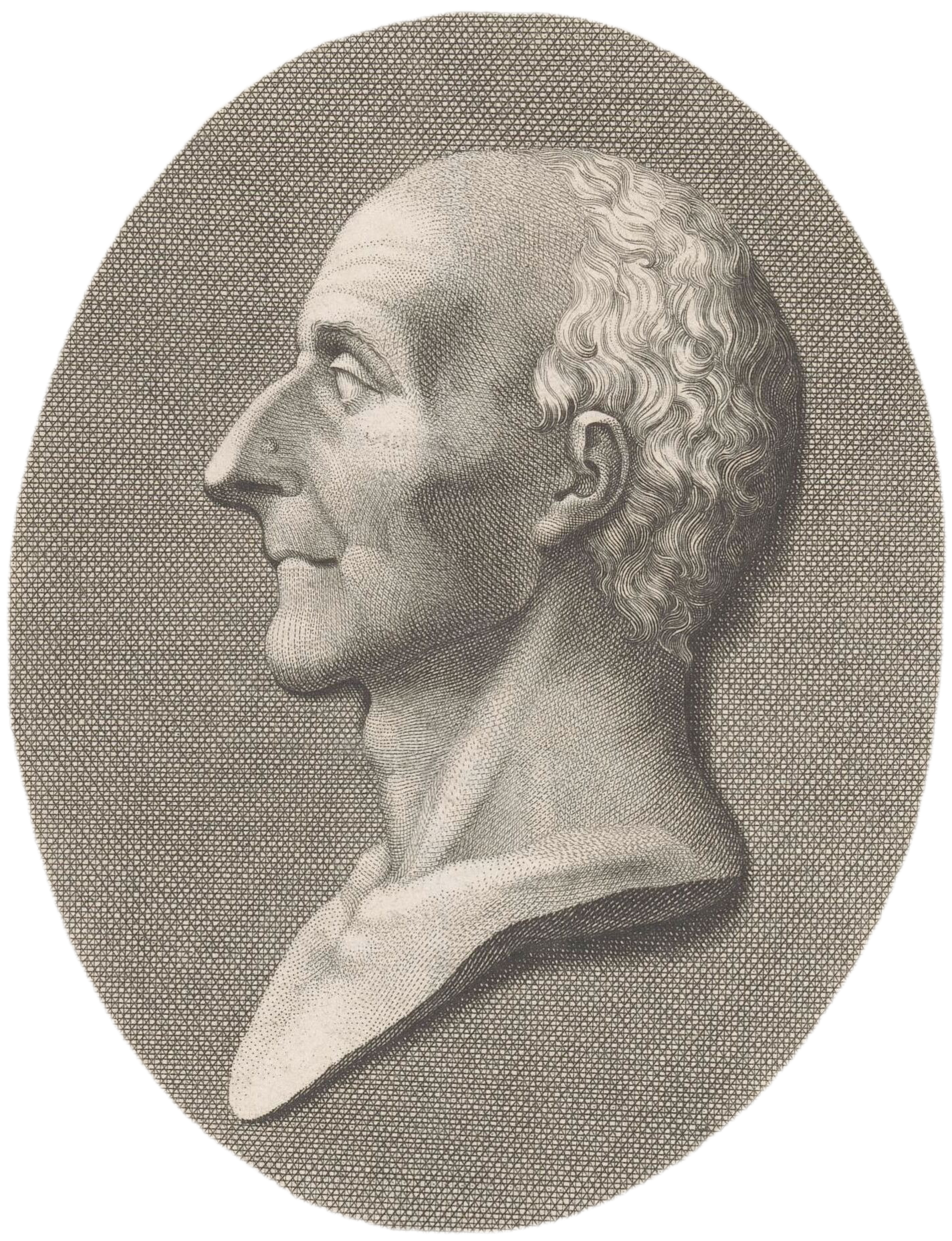
- Bonaventura Corti
- Born: 26 February 1729; Viano, Duchy of Modena and Reggio
- Died: 3 February 1813 (aged 83); Reggio Emilia, Kingdom of Italy
- Known for: Discovery of cytoplasmic streaming
- Parent(s): Domenico Corti and Vittoria Corti (née Bondioli)
- Scientific career
- Fields: Botany; Entomology; Physics
- Institutions: University of Modena
- Author abbrev. (botany): Corti

Bonaventura Corti (26 February 1729 – 3 February 1813) was an Italian Jesuit priest and naturalist who contributed to studies on microscopic organisms including the rotifers, ciliates and algae. He coined the word "plantanimal" for plant-like organisms which moved and could be revived from desiccation through the addition of water.

== Biography ==
Corti was born in Viano in the landed family of Giulio and Vittoria Bondioli, but orphaned at an early age, he was taken care of by a relative who initiated him into priesthood in 1740. He studied at the Jesuit seminary of Reggio Emilia, where he took an early interest in science. He was ordained in 1754 and became a teacher of metaphysics and geometry at the seminary. In 1757, he took an interest in comets. He succeeded Lazzaro Spallanzani at the Collegio di San Nazario in Reggio Emilia in 1768. In 1771, he took an interest in microscopic organisms, looking at the flow of fluid (protoplasmic streaming) within Charophyte algae. He was the first to describe the rotational movement of protoplasm within a cell. The original observations were soon neglected, and it took an additional thirty-three years before the subject received further attention. Corti became Rector of the church and confessor to the Duchess of Modena before his death in Reggio Emilia.

== Works ==
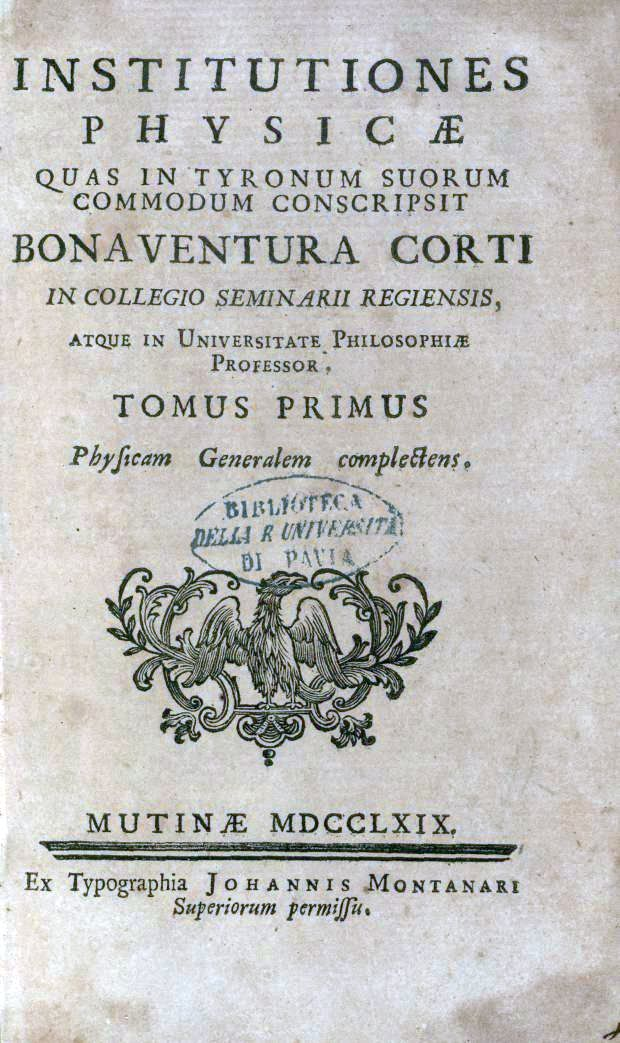
Institutiones physicae, 1769

- Institutiones physicae (in Latin). Vol. 1. Modena: Giovanni Montanari. 1769.
- Institutiones physicae (in Latin). Vol. 2. Modena: Giovanni Montanari. 1770.
- Osservazioni microscopiche sulla Tremella e sulla circolazione del fluido in una pianta acquajuola. Lucca: G. Rocchi. 1774.
- Mezzi per distruggere i vermi, che rodono il grano in erba nell'autunno, e nella primavera per ordine dell'illustrissimo Dicastero de' signori Riformatori degli studj dell'Università, e Stato di Modena a comune vantaggio pubblicati dall'abate Bonaventura Corti, In Modena: presso la Società tipografica, 1777.
