= Onion epidermal cell =

Outer cell layer

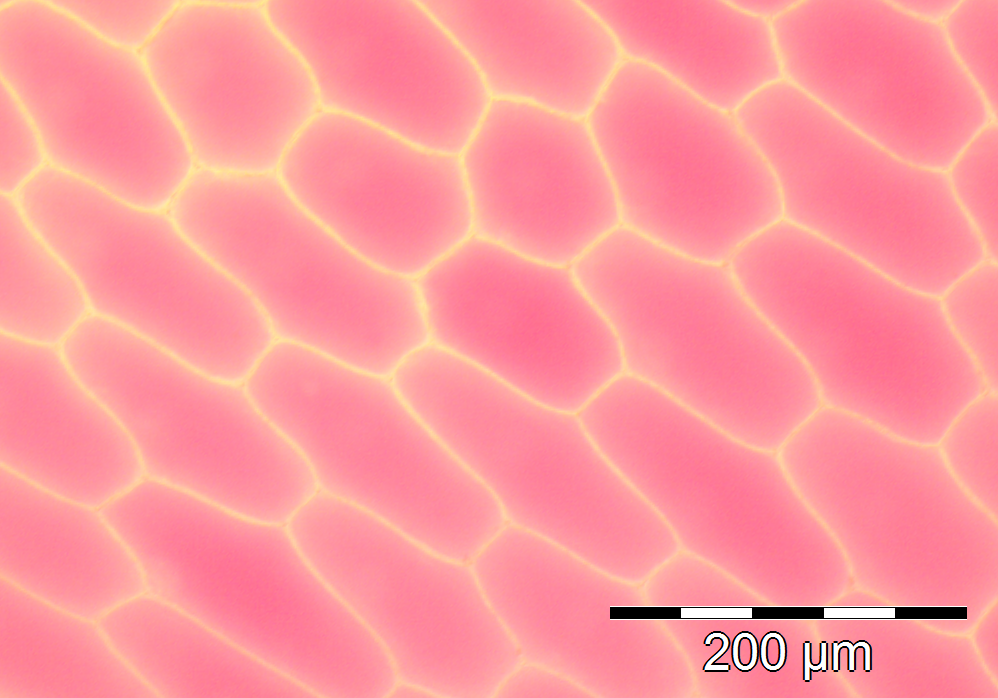
These large cells from the epidermis of a red onion are naturally pigmented.

The epidermal cells of onions provide a protective layer against viruses and fungi that may harm the sensitive tissues. Because of their simple structure and transparency they are often used to introduce students to plant anatomy or to demonstrate plasmolysis. The clear epidermal cells exist in a single layer and do not contain chloroplasts, because the onion fruiting body (bulb) is used for storing energy, not photosynthesis. Each plant cell has a cell wall, cell membrane, cytoplasm, nucleus, and a large vacuole. The nucleus is present at the periphery of the cytoplasm. The vacuole is prominent and present at the center of the cell, surrounded by cytoplasm.

Firm, small onions are best for microscopy. The epidermal layers are removed by cutting the onion and peeling them off (they are the membrane-like sheaths between each onion layer). For advanced microscopy, such as fluorescence microscopy, the layers halfway between the outside and the centre of the onion are best. Light microscopes are typically used for observing onion cells.
