= Laurence Irving (physiologist) =

- Born: May 3, 1895; Boston, Massachusetts, U.S.
- Died: November 20, 1979 (aged 84)
- Education: Bowdoin College; Stanford University; Harvard University
- Scientific career
- Fields: Comparative physiology

Laurence Irving (3 May 1895 – 20 November 1979) was a pioneering American scientist in the field of comparative physiology.

== Life and education ==
Irving was born in Boston, Massachusetts on 3 May 1895. He started his university education at Bowdoin College, where he gained a Bachelor of Science degree in 1916. Directly after graduation from Bowdoin he entered Harvard University where he obtained an MA in physiology in 1917. Following completion of his war service, Irving began a PhD at Stanford University.

Irving commenced his teaching career at Stanford in 1925 when he was appointed as an instructor. In 1928, he accepted a post as associate professor at the University of Toronto in the Department of Physiology. In 1931, he was appointed professor of experimental biology at Toronto. He remained in Toronto until 1937.

After leaving Canada, Irving spent the next 12 years teaching and researching at Swarthmore College, as a professor in the Department of Biology and chairman of their Zoology Department. While at Swarthmore, Irving began to correspond with the Norwegian biologist Per Fredrik Scholander, and had assisted August Krogh in arranging for Scholander to receive a Rockefeller fellowship. The fellowship was awarded for a collaboration on diving physiology between Scholander and Irving. When World War II broke out leaving Scholander stranded in Norway, Irving and Krogh managed to arrange for Scholander's urgent immigration. This would prove to be a profitable academic relationship for both Scholander and Irving, as they continued to collaborate until Irving's death.

In 1947, after returning to Swarthmore from his war service, Irving was appointed scientific director at the then-new Naval Arctic Research Laboratory in Barrow, Alaska. Two years later he was appointed the chief of the physiology section of the Arctic Health Research Center in Anchorage, where he began his pioneering research into arctic biology.

In November 1962, the National Academy of Sciences recommended the creation of the Institute of Arctic Biology. Irving was then appointed its first head, remaining in post until stepping down in 1966. He remained an advisory scientific director there and regularly attended seminars until his death in 1979.

In 1968 Irving was conferred an honorary Doctor of Science degree from the University of Alaska.

Irving was given the Arctic Institute of North America's Fellows Award in 1974 for "long and distinguished research in physiology of arctic life".

He died on 20 November 1979 in Fairbanks, Alaska, aged 84.

=== War service ===
During World War I Irving served in the U.S. Army, where he rose to the rank of first lieutenant by 1919. He had joined up with the American Expeditionary Force in 1917 on completion of his MA.

After the United States' entry into World War II, Irving joined the Army Air Corps. He remained there from 1943 until 1946 as chief physiologist,. Irving completed his World War II service at the rank of lieutenant colonel.

== Personal life ==
Irving and his first wife Elizabeth had three children. His daughter, Susan, and two sons, William and Laurence. His children settled across North America, and at his death were living in California, Alaska and Canada.

Irving maintained many international personal and professional relationships. After the death of professor Gustav Embden in 1936, Irving worked to secure the immigration of his daughter, Maja Embden, into Canada, allowing her to escape the rise of the Nazi regime. T.D. Simpson indicated that Irving also assisted a number of other German-Jewish scientists during this period prior to the war.

In 1951, his daughter Susan had married her father's longtime scientific collaborator, Per Fredrik Scholander. Susan was also a biologist, publishing as Susan Irving Scholander and Susan I. Scholander.

== Legacy ==
In 1971, the University of Alaska built a new building to house the Institute of Marine Sciences, joining the existing facility opened in 1965. These buildings were designated Biosciences I and II. On 16 August 1971 the buildings were jointly rededicated as the Laurence Irving Building for the Biosciences I and II in honor of Irving.
