= Turgor pressure =

Hydrostatic force in plants, fungi and also walled bacteria and protists

Turgor pressure is the force within the cell that pushes the plasma membrane against the cell wall.

It is also called hydrostatic pressure, and is defined as the pressure in a fluid measured at a certain point within itself when at equilibrium. Generally, turgor pressure is caused by the osmotic flow of water and occurs in plants, fungi, and bacteria. The phenomenon is also observed in protists that have cell walls. This system is not seen in animal cells, as the absence of a cell wall would cause the cell to lyse when under too much pressure. The pressure exerted by the osmotic flow of water is called turgidity. It is caused by the osmotic flow of water through a selectively permeable membrane. Movement of water through a semipermeable membrane from a volume with a low solute concentration to one with a higher solute concentration is called osmotic flow. In plants, this entails the water moving from the low concentration solute outside the cell into the cell's vacuole.

== Mechanism ==

Osmosis is the process in which water flows from a volume with a low solute concentration (osmolarity), to an adjacent region with a higher solute concentration until equilibrium between the two areas is reached. It is usually accompanied by a favorable increase in the entropy of the solvent. All cells are surrounded by a lipid bi-layer cell membrane which permits the flow of water into and out of the cell while limiting the flow of solutes. When the cell is in a hypertonic solution, water flows out of the cell, which decreases the cell's volume. When in a hypotonic solution, water flows into the membrane and increases the cell's volume, while in an isotonic solution, water flows in and out of the cell at an equal rate.

Turgidity is the point at which the cell's membrane pushes against the cell wall, which is when turgor pressure is high. When the cell has low turgor pressure, it is flaccid. In plants, this is shown as wilted anatomical structures. This is more specifically known as plasmolysis.

A turgid and flaccid cell

The volume and geometry of the cell affects the value of turgor pressure and how it can affect the cell wall's plasticity. Studies have shown that smaller cells experience a stronger elastic change when compared to larger cells.

Turgor pressure also plays a key role in plant cell growth when the cell wall undergoes irreversible expansion due to the force of turgor pressure as well as structural changes in the cell wall that alter its extensibility.

== Turgor pressure in plants ==
Turgor pressure within cells is regulated by osmosis and this also causes the cell wall to expand during growth. Along with size, rigidity of the cell is also caused by turgor pressure; a lower pressure results in a wilted cell or plant structure (i.e. leaf, stalk). One mechanism in plants that regulate turgor pressure is the cell's semipermeable membrane, which allows only some solutes to travel in and out of the cell, maintaining a minimum pressure. Other mechanisms include transpiration, which results in water loss and decreases turgidity in cells. Turgor pressure is also a large factor for nutrient transport throughout the plant. Cells of the same organism can have differing turgor pressures throughout the organism's structure. In vascular plants, turgor pressure is responsible for apical growth of features such as root tips and pollen tubes.

=== Dispersal ===
Transport proteins that pump solutes into the cell can be regulated by cell turgor pressure. Lower values allow for an increase in the pumping of solutes, which in turn increases osmotic pressure. This function is important as a plant response under drought conditions (seeing as turgor pressure is maintained), and for cells which need to accumulate solutes (i.e. developing fruits).

=== Flowering and reproductive organs ===
It has been recorded that the petals of Gentiana kochiana and Kalanchoe blossfeldiana bloom via volatile turgor pressure of cells on the plant's adaxial surface. During processes like anther dehiscence, it has been observed that drying endothecium cells cause an outward bending force which leads to the release of pollen. This means that lower turgor pressures are observed in these structures due to the fact that they are dehydrated. Pollen tubes are cells which elongate when pollen lands on the stigma, at the carpal tip. These cells undergo tip growth rather quickly due to increases in turgor pressure. The pollen tube of lilies have a mean turgor pressure of 0.21 MPa when growing during this process.

=== Seed dispersal ===
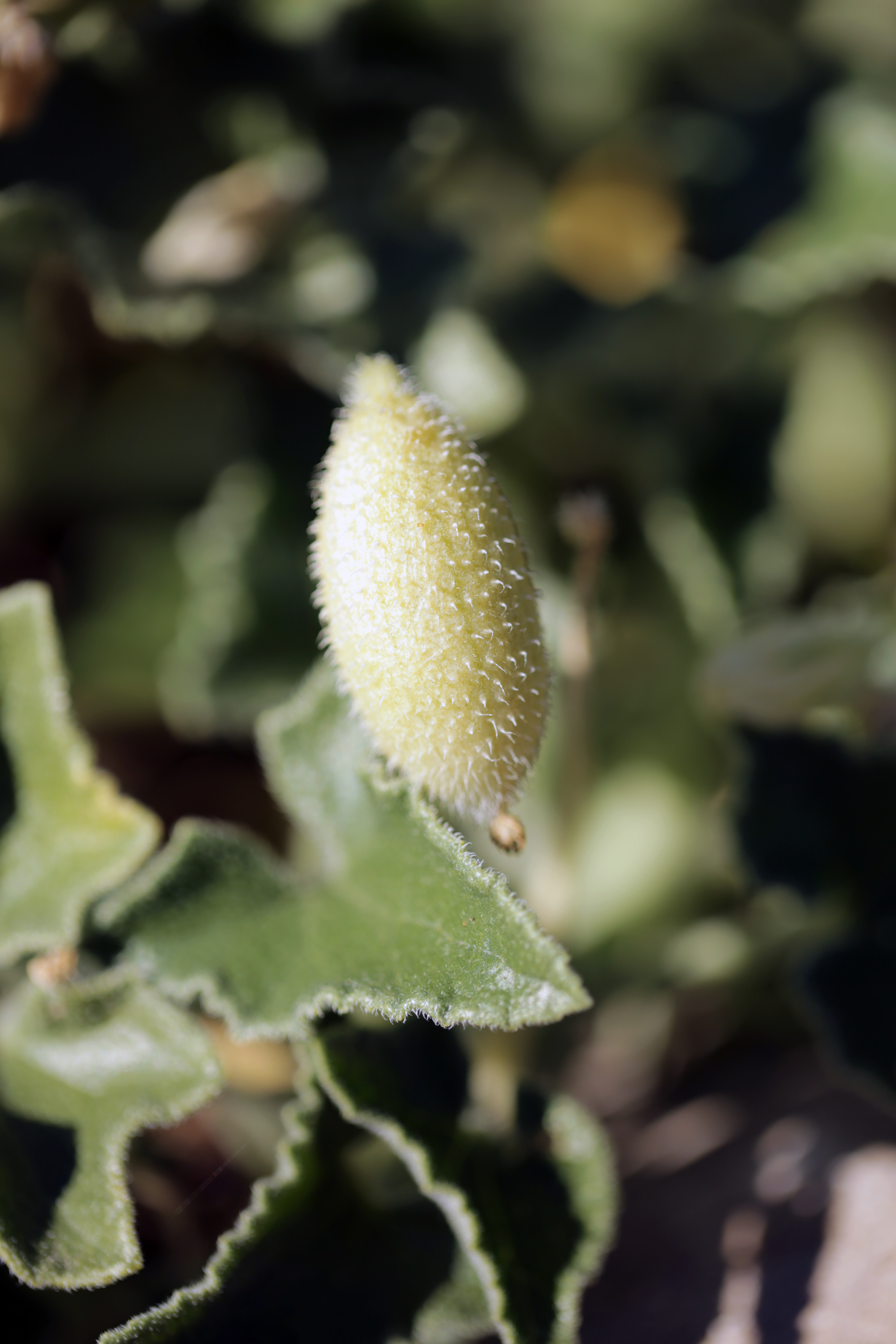
Mature squirting cucumber fruit

In fruits such as Impatiens parviflora, Oxalia acetosella and Ecballium elaterium, turgor pressure is the method by which seeds are dispersed. In Ecballium elaterium, or squirting cucumber, turgor pressure builds up in the fruit to the point that it aggressively detaches from the stalk, and seeds and water are squirted everywhere as the fruit falls to the ground. Turgor pressure within the fruit ranges from .003 to 1.0 MPa.

=== Growth ===
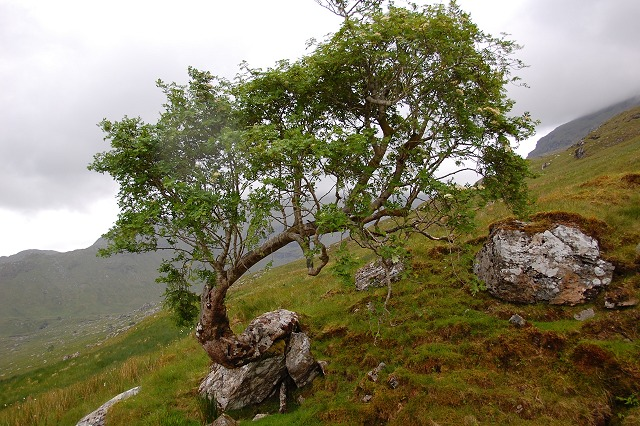
Tree roots penetrating rock

The action of turgor pressure on extensible cell walls is usually said to be the driving force of growth within the cell. An increase of turgor pressure causes expansion of cells and extension of apical cells, pollen tubes, and other plant structures such as root tips. Cell expansion and an increase in turgor pressure is due to inward diffusion of water into the cell, and turgor pressure increases due to the increasing volume of vacuolar sap. A growing root cell's turgor pressure can be up to 0.6 MPa, which is over three times that of a car tire. Epidermal cells in a leaf can have pressures ranging from 1.5 to 2.0 MPa. These high pressures can explain why plants can grow through asphalt and other hard surfaces.

=== Turgidity ===
Turgidity is observed in a cell where the cell membrane is pushed against the cell wall. In some plants, cell walls loosen at a faster rate than water can cross the membrane, which results in cells with lower turgor pressure.

=== Stomata ===
Open stomata on the left and closed stomata on the right

Turgor pressure within the stomata regulates when the stomata can open and close, which plays a role in transpiration rates of the plant. This is also important because this function regulates water loss within the plant. Lower turgor pressure can mean that the cell has a low water concentration and closing the stomata would help to preserve water. High turgor pressure keeps the stomata open for gas exchanges necessary for photosynthesis.

=== Mimosa pudica ===
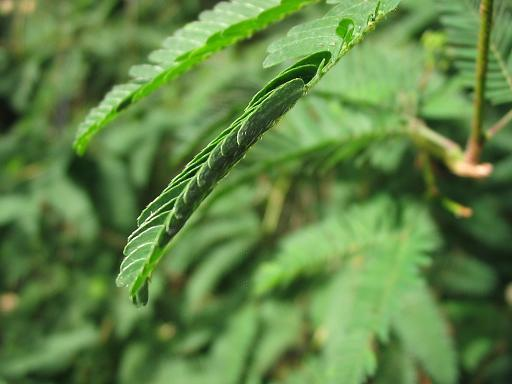
Mimosa pudica

It has been concluded that loss of turgor pressure within the leaves of Mimosa pudica is responsible for the plant's reaction when touched. Other factors such as changes in osmotic pressure, protoplasmic contraction and increase in cellular permeability have been observed to affect this response. It has also been recorded that turgor pressure is different in the upper and lower pulvinar cells of the plant, and the movement of potassium and calcium ions throughout the cells cause the increase in turgor pressure. When touched, the pulvinus is activated and exudes contractile proteins, which in turn increases turgor pressure and closes the leaves of the plant.

== Function in other taxa ==
As earlier stated, turgor pressure can be found in other organisms besides plants and can play a large role in the development, movement, and nature of said organisms.

=== Fungi ===
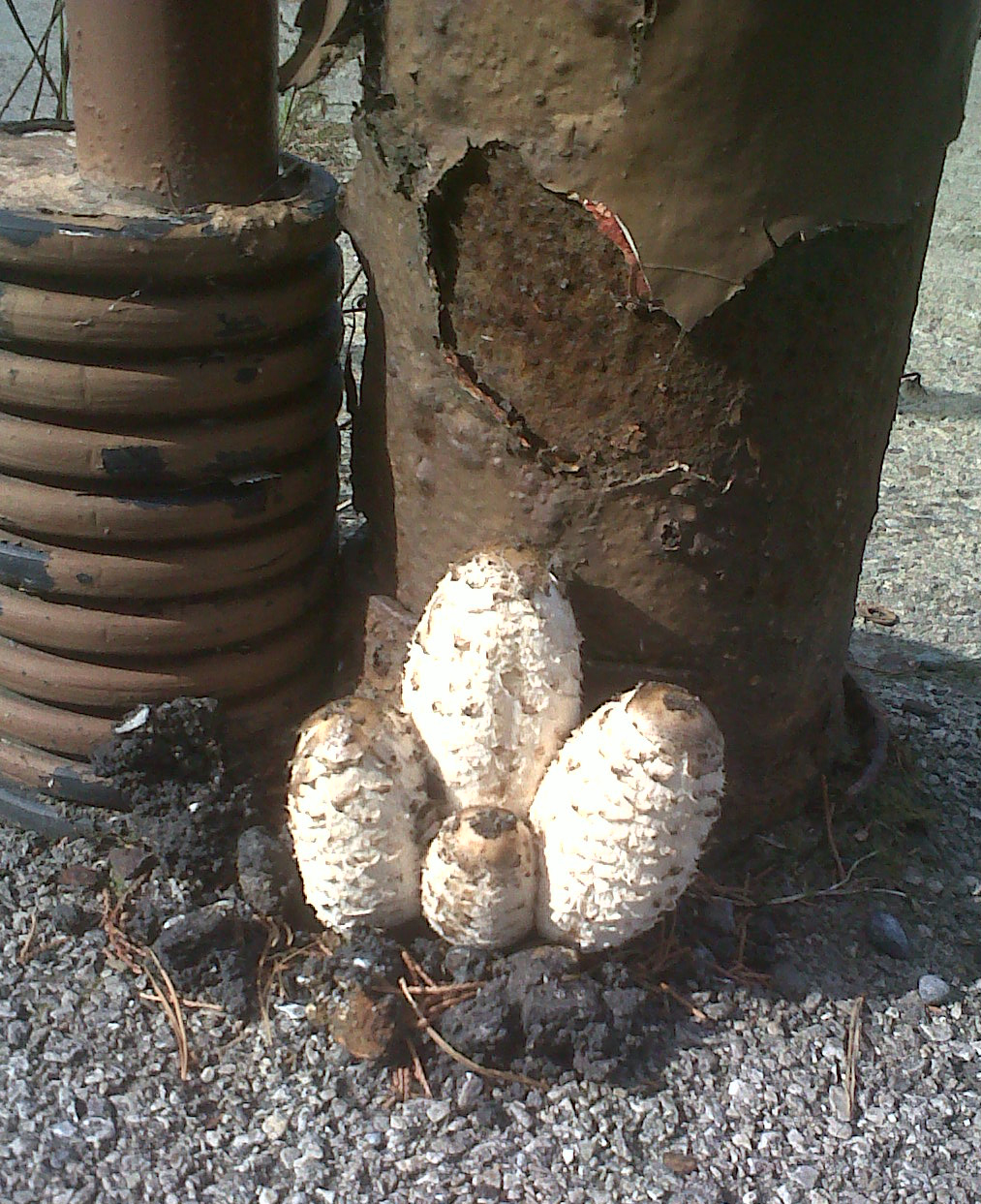
Shaggy ink caps bursting through asphalt due to high turgor pressure

In fungi, turgor pressure has been observed as a large factor in substrate penetration. In species such as Saprolegnia ferax, Magnaporthe grisea and Aspergillus oryzae, immense turgor pressures have been observed in their hyphae. The study showed that they could penetrate substances like plant cells, and synthetic materials such as polyvinyl chloride. In observations of this phenomenon, it is noted that invasive hyphal growth is due to turgor pressure, along with the coenzymes secreted by the fungi to invade said substrates. Hyphal growth is directly related to turgor pressure, and growth slows as turgor pressure decreases. In Magnaporthe grisea, pressures of up to 8 MPa have been observed.

=== Protists ===
Some protists do not have cell walls and cannot experience turgor pressure. These few protists use their contractile vacuole to regulate the quantity of water within the cell. Protist cells avoid lysing in hypotonic solution by utilizing a vacuole which pumps water out of the cells to maintain osmotic equilibrium.

=== Animals ===
Turgor pressure is not observed in animal cells because they lack a cell wall. In organisms with cell walls, the cell wall prevents the cell from being lysed by high turgor pressure.

=== Diatoms ===
In diatoms, the Heterokontophyta have polyphyletic turgor-resistant cell walls. Throughout these organisms' life cycle, carefully controlled turgor pressure is responsible for cell expansion and for the release of sperm, but not for processes such as seta growth.

=== Cyanobacteria ===
Gas-vaculate cyanobacterium are the ones generally responsible for water-blooms. They have the ability to float due to the accumulation of gases within their vacuole, and the role of turgor pressure and its effect on the capacity of these vacuoles has been reported in varying scientific papers. It is noted that the higher the turgor pressure, the lower the capacity of the gas-vacuoles in different cyanobacteria. Experiments used to correlate osmosis and turgor pressure in prokaryotes have been used to show how diffusion of solutes into the cell affects turgor pressure within the cell.

== Measurements ==
When measuring turgor pressure in plants, many factors have to be taken into account. It is generally stated that fully turgid cells have a turgor pressure that is equal to that of the cell and that flaccid cells have a value at or near zero. Other cellular mechanisms to be taken into consideration include the protoplast, solutes within the protoplast (solute potential), transpiration rates of the cell and the tension of cell walls. Measurement is limited depending on the method used, some of which are explored and explained below. Not all methods can be used for all organisms, due to size or other properties. For example, a diatom does not have the same properties as a plant, which would place limitations on methods that could be used to infer turgor pressure.

=== Units ===
Units used to measure turgor pressure are independent from the measures used to infer its values. Common units include bars, MPa, or newtons per square meter. 1 bar is equal to 0.1 MPa.

=== Methods ===
==== Water potential equation ====
Turgor pressure can be deduced when the total water potential, Ψ_{w}, and the osmotic potential, Ψ_{s}, are known in a water potential equation. These equations are used to measure the total water potential of a plant by using variables such as matric potential, osmotic potential, pressure potential, gravitational effects and turgor pressure. After taking the difference between Ψ_{s} and Ψ_{w}, the value for turgor pressure is obtained. When using this method, gravity and matric potential are considered to be negligible, since their values are generally either negative or close to zero.

==== Pressure-bomb technique ====
Diagram of a pressure bomb

The pressure bomb technique was developed by Scholander et al., reviewed by Tyree and Hammel in their 1972 publication, in order to test water movement through plants. The instrument is used to measure turgor pressure by placing a leaf (with stem attached) into a closed chamber where pressurized gas is added in increments. Measurements are taken when xylem sap appears out of the cut surface and at the point which it doesn't accumulate or retreat back into the cut surface.

==== Atomic force microscope ====
Atomic force microscopes use a type of scanning probe microscopy (SPM). Small probes are introduced to the area of interest, and a spring within the probe measures values via displacement. This method can be used to measure turgor pressure of organisms. When using this method, supplemental information such as continuum mechanic equations, single force depth curves and cell geometries can be used to quantify turgor pressures within a given area (usually a cell).

==== Pressure probe ====
This machine was originally used to measure individual algal cells, but can now be used on larger-celled specimens. It is usually used on higher plant tissues but was not used to measure turgor pressure until Hüsken and Zimmerman improved the method. Pressure probes measure turgor pressure via displacement. A glass micro-capillary tube is inserted into the cell and whatever the cell exudes into the tube is observed through a microscope. An attached device then measures how much pressure is required to push the emission back into the cell.

===== Micro-manipulation probe =====
These are used to accurately quantify measurements of smaller cells. In an experiment by Weber, Smith and colleagues, single tomato cells were compressed between a micro-manipulation probe and glass to allow the pressure probe's micro-capillary to find the cell's turgor pressure.

== Theoretical speculations ==
=== Negative turgor pressure ===
It has been observed that the value of Ψ_{w} decreases as the cell becomes more dehydrated, but scientists have speculated whether this value will continue to decrease but never fall to zero, or if the value can be less than zero. There have been studies which show that negative cell pressures can exist in xerophytic plants, but a paper by M. T. Tyree explores whether this is possible, or a conclusion based on misinterpreted data. He concludes that claims of negative turgor pressure values were incorrect and resulted from mis-categorization of "bound" and "free" water in a cell. By analyzing the isotherms of apoplastic and symplastic water, he shows that negative turgor pressures cannot be present within arid plants due to net water loss of the specimen during droughts. Despite this analysis and interpretation of data, negative turgor pressure values are still used within the scientific community.

=== Tip growth in higher plants ===
A hypothesis presented by M. Harold and colleagues suggests that tip growth in higher plants is amoebic in nature, and is not caused by turgor pressure as is widely believed, meaning that extension is caused by the actin cytoskeleton in these plant cells. Regulation of cell growth is implied to be caused by cytoplasmic micro-tubules which control the orientation of cellulose fibrils, which are deposited into the adjacent cell wall and results in growth. In plants, the cells are surrounded by cell walls and filamentous proteins which retain and adjust the plant cell's growth and shape. It is concluded that lower plants grow through apical growth, which differs since the cell wall only expands on one end of the cell.
