= Osmosis =

Movement of molecules to lower concentration

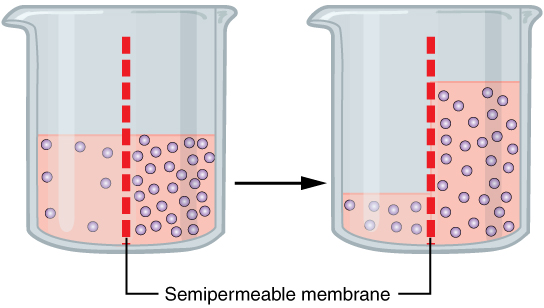
The process of osmosis over a semipermeable membrane. The blue dots represent particles driving the osmotic gradient.

Osmosis (/ɒzˈmoʊsɪs/, US also /ɒs-/) is the spontaneous net movement of solvent molecules through a selectively permeable membrane from a region of high water potential (region of lower solute concentration) to a region of low water potential (region of higher solute concentration), in the direction that tends to equalize the solute concentrations on the two sides. It may also be used to describe a physical process in which any solvent moves across a selectively permeable membrane (permeable to the solvent, but not the solute) separating two solutions of different concentrations. Osmosis can be made to do work. Osmotic pressure is defined as the external pressure required to prevent net movement of solvent across the membrane. Osmotic pressure is a colligative property, meaning that the osmotic pressure depends on the molar concentration of the solute but not on its identity. Osmotic transport occurs through viscous flow of the solvent under a pressure gradient.

Osmosis is a vital process in biological systems, as biological membranes are semipermeable. In general, these membranes are impermeable to large and polar molecules, such as ions, proteins, and polysaccharides, while being permeable to non-polar or hydrophobic molecules like lipids as well as to small molecules like oxygen, carbon dioxide, nitrogen, and nitric oxide. Permeability depends on solubility, charge, or chemistry, as well as solute size. Water molecules travel through the plasma membrane, tonoplast membrane (vacuole) or organelle membranes across the phospholipid bilayer via aquaporins through a selective pore flow mechanism. Osmosis provides the primary means by which water is transported into and out of cells. The turgor pressure of a cell is largely maintained by osmosis across the cell membrane between the cell interior and its relatively hypotonic environment.

== History ==
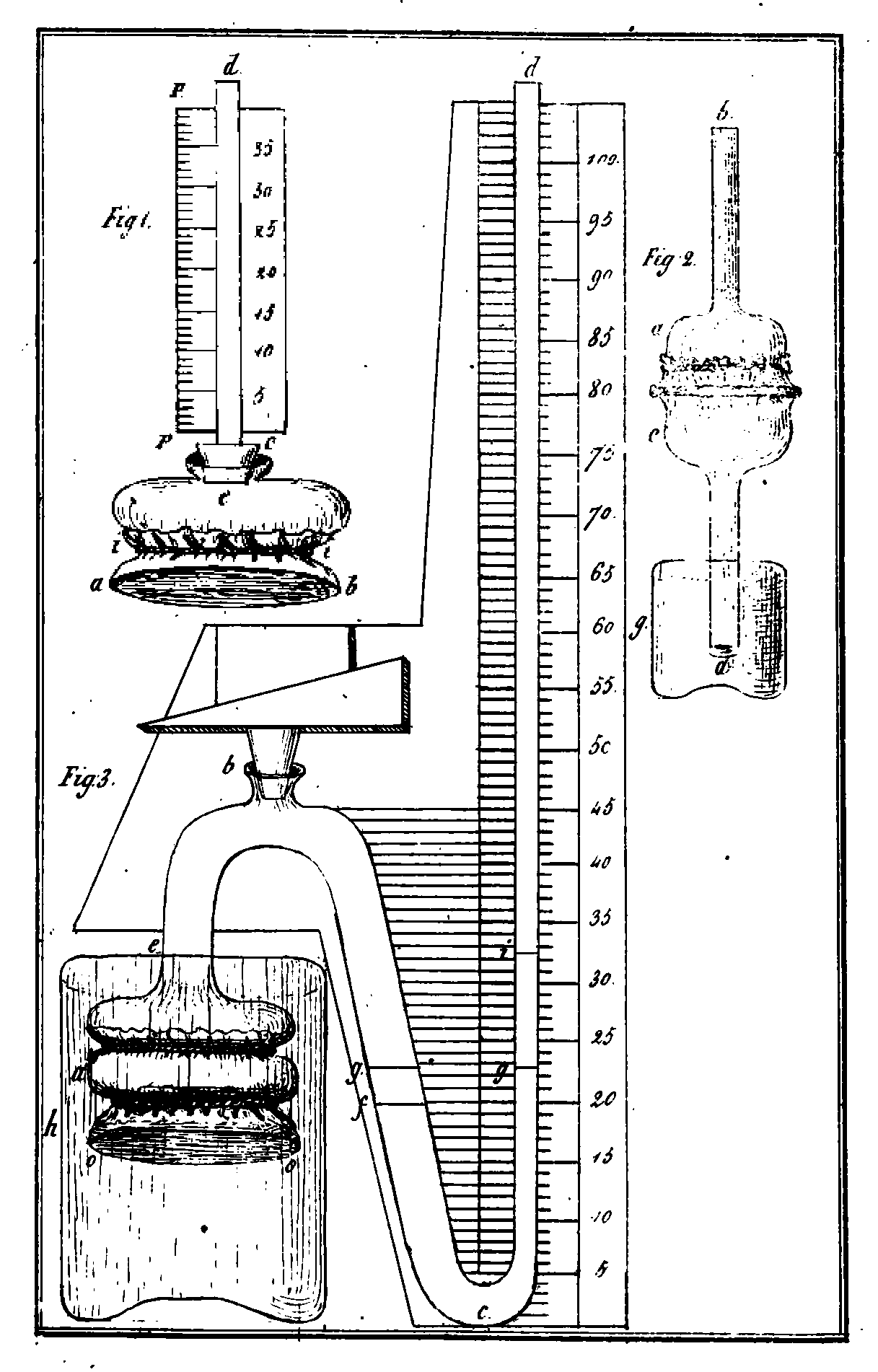
The "endosmometer" invented by Dutrochet

Some kinds of osmotic flow have been observed since ancient times, e.g., on the construction of Egyptian pyramids. Jean-Antoine Nollet first documented observation of osmosis in 1748. (Note: Histoire de l'Académie Royale des Sciences Année 1748, published in 1752, contains a condensed version of Nollet's article on pages 10–19. Original text: Avant que de finir ce Mémoire, je crois devoir rendre compte d'un fait que je dois au hasard, & qui me parut d'abord … singulier … j'en avois rempli une fiole cylindrique, longue de cinq pouces, & d'un pouce de diamètre ou environ; & l'ayant couverte d'un morceau de vessie mouillée & ficelée au col du vaisseau, je l'avois plongée dans un grand vase plein d'eau, afin d'être sûr qu'il ne rentrât aucun air dans l'esprit de vin. Au bout de cinq ou six heures, je fus tout surpris de voir que la fiole étoit plus pleine qu'au moment de son immersion, quoiqu'elle le fût alors autant que ses bords pouvoient le permettre; la vessie qui lui servoit de bouchon, étoit devenue convexe & si tendue, qu'en la piquant avec une épingle, il en sortit un jet de liqueur qui s'éleva à plus d'un pied de hauteur. Translation: Before finishing this memoir, I think I should report an event that I owe to chance and which at first seemed to me … strange … I filled [with alcohol] a cylindrical vial, five inches long and about one inch in diameter; and [after] having covered it with piece of damp bladder [which was] tied to the neck of the vial, I immersed it in a large bowl full of water, in order to be sure that no air re-entered the alcohol. At the end of 5 or 6 hours, I was very surprised to see that the vial was fuller than at the moment of its immersion, although it [had been filled] as far as its sides would allow; the bladder that served as its cap, bulged and had become so stretched that on pricking it with a needle, there came from it a jet of alcohol that rose more than a foot high.) The word "osmosis" descends from the words "endosmose" and "exosmose", which were coined by French physician René Joachim Henri Dutrochet (1776–1847) from the Greek words ἔνδον (éndon "within"), ἔξω (éxō "outer, external"), and ὠσμός (ōsmós "push, impulsion"). (Note: Etymology of "osmosis" : Henri Dutrochet, L'Agent Immédiat du Movement Vital Dévoilé dans sa Nature et dans son Mode d'Action chez les Végétaux et chez les Animaux [The immediate agent of living movement, its nature and mode of action revealed in plants and animals] (Paris, France: Dentu, 1826), pp. 115 and 126.; The intermediate word "osmose" and the word "osmotic" were coined by Scottish chemist Thomas Graham. See: Thomas Graham (1854) "VII. The Bakerian Lecture – On Osmotic Force," Philosophical Transactions of the Royal Society (London), vol. 144, pp. 177–288; see especially pp. 177, 178, and 227. See also: Thomas Graham and Henry Watts, Elements of Chemistry: Including the Applications of the Sciences in the Arts, 2nd ed. (London, England: Hippolyte Bailliere, 1858), vol. 2, p. 616.; The word "osmosis" first appeared in: Jabez Hogg, The Microscope: Its History, Construction, and Application..., 6th ed. (London, England: George Routledge and Sons, 1867), p. 226.; The etymology of the word "osmosis" is discussed in: Homer W. Smith (1960). "I. Theory of Solutions: A knowledge of the laws of solutions". Circulation. 21 (5): 808–817 (810). doi:10.1161/01.CIR.21.5.808. PMID 13831991.) In 1867, Moritz Traube invented highly selective precipitation membranes, advancing the art and technique of measurement of osmotic flow.

== Description ==
Osmosis is the movement of a solvent across a semipermeable membrane toward a higher concentration of solute. In biological systems, the solvent is typically water, but osmosis can occur in other liquids, supercritical liquids, and even gases.

When a cell is submerged in water, the water molecules pass through the cell membrane from an area of low solute concentration to high solute concentration. For example, if the cell is submerged in saltwater, water molecules move out of the cell. If a cell is submerged in freshwater, water molecules move into the cell.

Water passing through a semipermeable membrane

When the membrane has a volume of pure water on both sides, water molecules pass in and out in each direction at exactly the same rate. There is no net flow of water through the membrane.

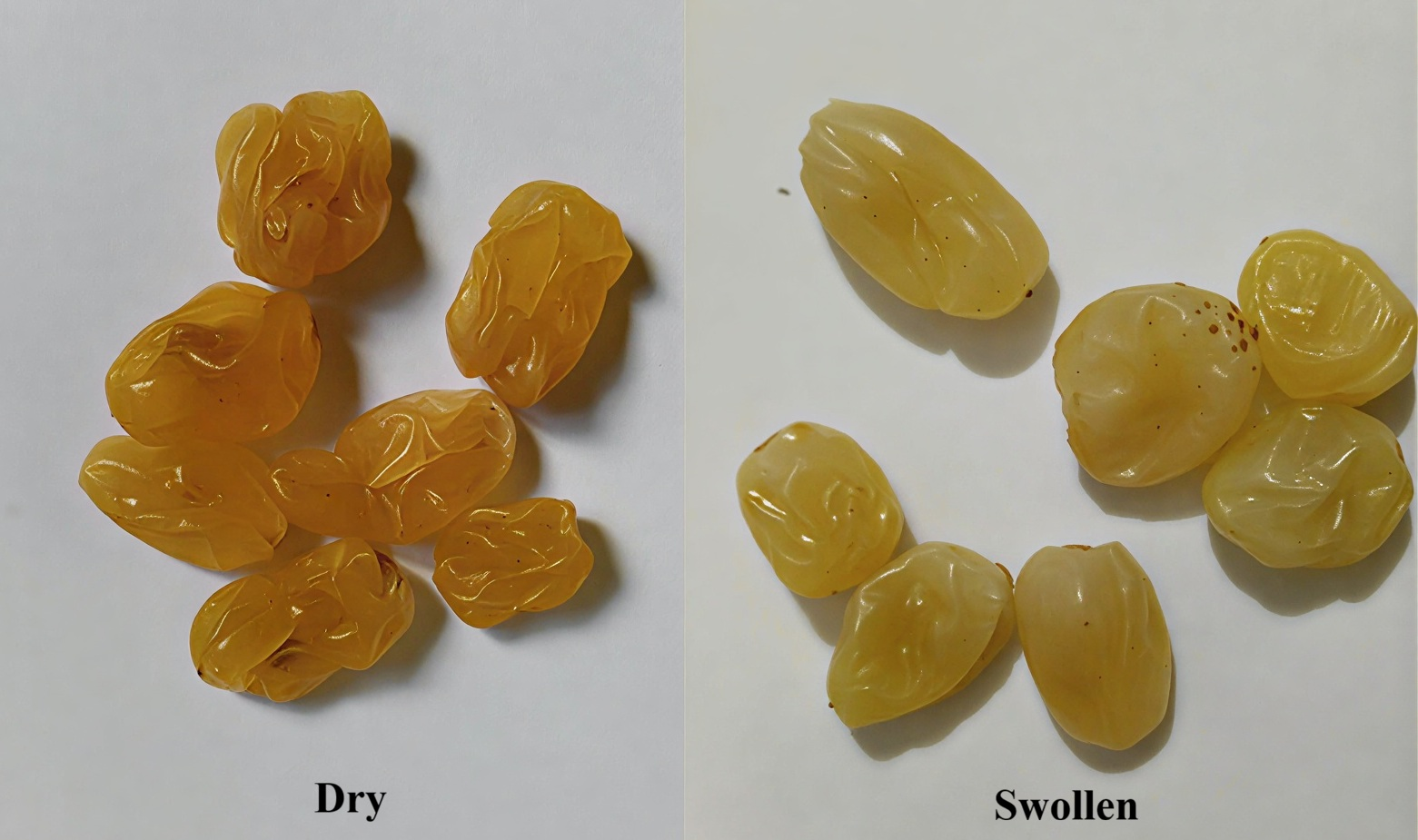
Raisin swells due to osmosis when kept under water

Osmosis can be demonstrated when potato slices are added to a high salt solution. The water from inside the potato moves out to the solution, causing the potato to shrink and to lose its 'turgor pressure'. The more concentrated the salt solution, the bigger the loss in size and weight of the potato slice.

Chemical gardens demonstrate the effect of osmosis in inorganic chemistry.

== Mechanism ==
The mechanism responsible for driving osmosis could be misinterpreted as either the dilution of water by solute (resulting in lower concentration of water on the higher solute concentration side of the membrane and therefore a diffusion of water along a concentration gradient) or by a solute's attraction to water (resulting in less free water on the higher solute concentration side of the membrane and therefore net movement of water toward the solute). Both of these notions have been conclusively refuted.

The diffusion model of osmosis is rendered untenable by the fact that osmosis can drive water across a membrane toward a higher concentration of water. The "bound water" model is refuted by the fact that osmosis is independent of the size of the solute molecules—a colligative property—or how hydrophilic they are.

It is difficult to describe osmosis without a mechanical or thermodynamic explanation, but essentially there is an interaction between the solute and water that counteracts the pressure that otherwise free solute molecules would exert. One fact to take note of is that heat from the surroundings is able to be converted into mechanical energy (water rising). Therefore, osmotic solvent transport is a pressure-driven process, instead of random molecular diffusion.

Many thermodynamic explanations go into the concept of chemical potential and how the function of the water on the solution side differs from that of pure water due to the higher pressure and the presence of the solute counteracting such that the chemical potential remains unchanged. The virial theorem demonstrates that attraction between the molecules (water and solute) reduces the pressure, and thus the pressure exerted by water molecules on each other in solution is less than in pure water, allowing pure water to "force" the solution until the pressure reaches equilibrium.

== Role in living things ==
Effect of different solutions on blood cells

Micrographs of osmotic pressure on red blood cells (RBC)

Plant cell in different environments.

Osmotic pressure is the main agent of support in many plants. The osmotic entry of water raises the turgor pressure exerted against the cell wall, until it equals the osmotic pressure, creating a steady state.

When a plant cell is placed in a solution that is hypertonic relative to the cytoplasm, water moves out of the cell and the cell shrinks. In doing so, the cell becomes flaccid. In extreme cases, the cell becomes plasmolyzed – the cell membrane disengages with the cell wall due to lack of water pressure on it.

When a plant cell is placed in a solution that is hypotonic relative to the cytoplasm, water moves into the cell and the cell swells to become turgid.

Osmosis also plays a vital role in human cells by facilitating the movement of water across cell membranes. This process is crucial for maintaining proper cell hydration, as cells can be sensitive to dehydration or overhydration. In human cells, osmosis is essential for maintaining the balance of water and solutes, ensuring optimal cellular function. Imbalances in osmotic pressure can lead to cellular dysfunction, highlighting the importance of osmosis in sustaining the health and integrity of human cells.

In certain environments, osmosis can be harmful to organisms. Freshwater and saltwater aquarium fish, for example, will quickly die should they be placed in water of a maladaptive salinity. The osmotic effect of table salt to kill leeches and slugs is another example of a way osmosis can cause harm to organisms.

Suppose an animal or plant cell is placed in a solution of sugar or salt in water.

- If the medium is hypotonic relative to the cell cytoplasm, the cell will gain water through osmosis.
- If the medium is isotonic, there will be no net movement of water across the cell membrane.
- If the medium is hypertonic relative to the cell cytoplasm, the cell will lose water by osmosis.

This means that if a cell is put in a solution which has a solute concentration higher than its own, it will shrivel, and if it is put in a solution with a lower solute concentration than its own, the cell will swell and may even burst.

== Factors ==
=== Osmotic pressure ===
Osmosis may be opposed by increasing the pressure in the region of high solute concentration with respect to that in the low solute concentration region. The force per unit area, or pressure, required to prevent the passage of water (or any other high-liquidity solution) through a selectively permeable membrane and into a solution of greater concentration is equivalent to the osmotic pressure of the solution, or turgor. Osmotic pressure is a colligative property, meaning that the property depends on the concentration of the solute, but not on its content or chemical identity.

=== Osmotic gradient ===
The osmotic gradient is the difference in concentration between two solutions on either side of a semipermeable membrane, and is used to tell the difference in percentages of the concentration of a specific particle dissolved in a solution.

Usually the osmotic gradient is used while comparing solutions that have a semipermeable membrane between them allowing water to diffuse between the two solutions, toward the hypertonic solution (the solution with the higher concentration). Eventually, the force of the column of water on the hypertonic side of the semipermeable membrane will equal the force of diffusion on the hypotonic (the side with a lesser concentration) side, creating equilibrium. When equilibrium is reached, water continues to flow, but it flows both ways in equal amounts as well as force, therefore stabilizing the solution.

== Variation ==
=== Reverse osmosis ===
Reverse osmosis is a separation process that uses pressure to force a solvent through a semi-permeable membrane that retains the solute on one side and allows the pure solvent to pass to the other side, forcing it from a region of high solute concentration through a membrane to a region of low solute concentration by applying a pressure in excess of the osmotic pressure. This process is known primarily for its role in turning seawater into drinking water, when salt and other unwanted substances are ridded from the water molecules.

=== Forward osmosis ===
Osmosis may be used directly to achieve separation of water from a solution containing unwanted solutes. A "draw" solution of higher osmotic pressure than the feed solution is used to induce a net flow of water through a semi-permeable membrane, such that the feed solution becomes concentrated as the draw solution becomes dilute. The diluted draw solution may then be used directly (as with an ingestible solute like glucose), or sent to a secondary separation process for the removal of the draw solute. This secondary separation can be more efficient than a reverse osmosis process would be alone, depending on the draw solute used and the feedwater treated. Forward osmosis is an area of ongoing research, focusing on applications in desalination, water purification, water treatment, food processing, and other areas of study.

== Future developments in osmosis ==
Future developments in osmosis and osmosis research hold promise for a range of applications. Researchers are exploring advanced materials for more efficient osmotic processes, leading to improved water desalination and purification technologies. Additionally, the integration of osmotic power generation, where the osmotic pressure difference between saltwater and freshwater is harnessed for energy, presents a sustainable and renewable energy source with significant potential. Furthermore, the field of medical research is looking at innovative drug delivery systems that utilize osmotic principles, offering precise and controlled administration of medications within the body. As technology and understanding in this field continue to evolve, the applications of osmosis are expected to expand, addressing various global challenges in water sustainability, energy generation, and healthcare.

== See also ==
- Brining
- Homeostasis
- Osmoregulation
- Osmotic shock
- Osmotic power
- Plasmolysis
- Reverse osmosis plant
- Salinity gradient power
- Water potential
