= Mammalian kidney =

Paired organ in the urinary system of mammals

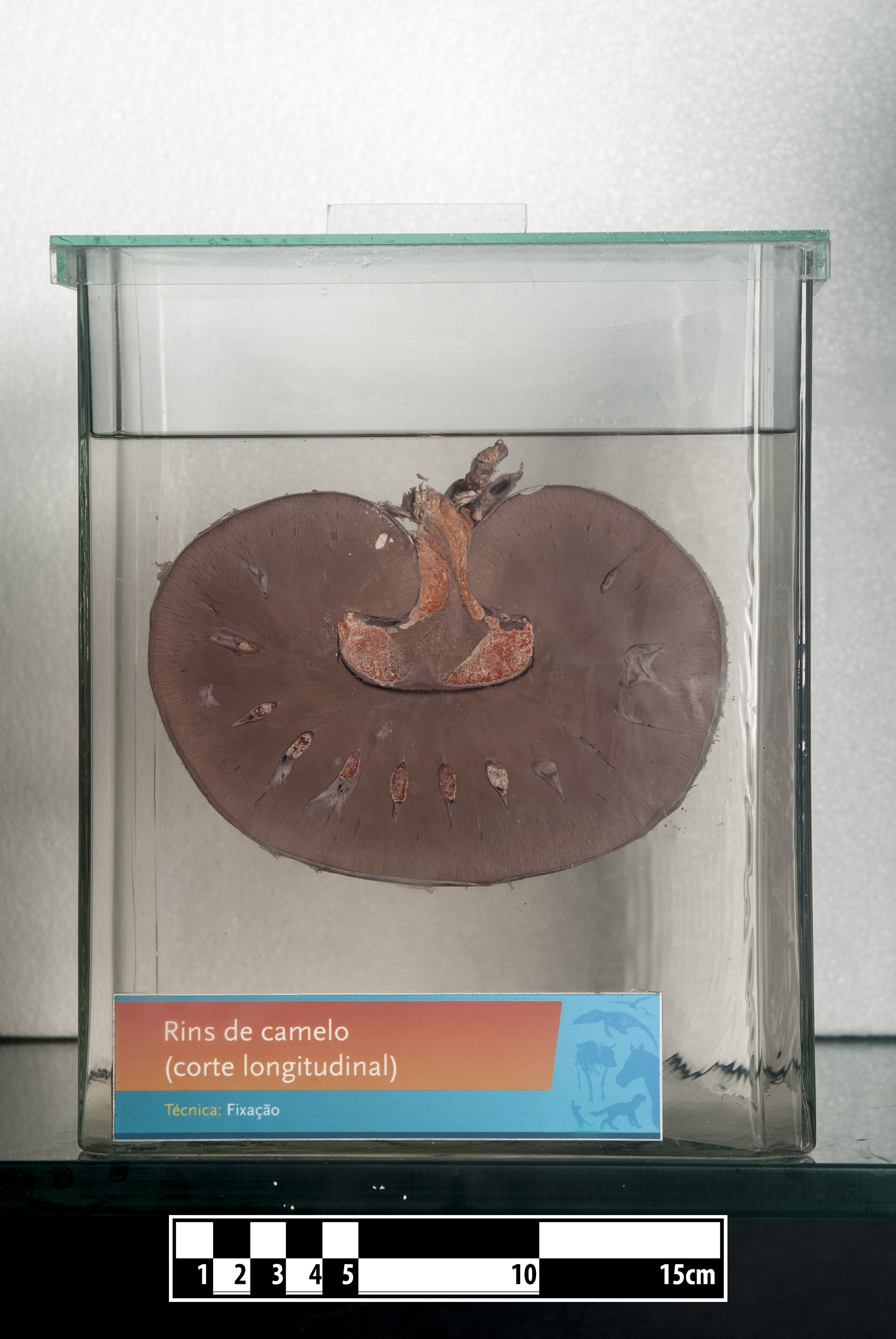
- Unipapillary, multilobar, smooth, bean-shaped camel kidney, in which the renal papillae are completely fused into the renal crest.

Details
- Precursor: Ureteric bud, metanephrogenic blastema
- System: Urinary system and endocrine system
- Artery: Renal artery
- Vein: Renal vein
- Nerve: Renal plexus
- Lymph: Collecting lymphatic vessels

The mammalian kidneys are a pair of excretory organs of the urinary system of mammals, being functioning kidneys in postnatal-to-adult individuals (i.e. metanephric kidneys). The kidneys in mammals are usually bean-shaped or externally lobulated. They are located behind the peritoneum (retroperitoneally) on the back (dorsal) wall of the body. The typical mammalian kidney consists of a renal capsule, a peripheral cortex, an internal medulla, one or more renal calyces, and a renal pelvis. Although the calyces or renal pelvis may be absent in some species. The medulla is made up of one or more renal pyramids, forming papillae with their innermost parts. Generally, urine produced by the cortex and medulla drains from the papillae into the calyces, and then into the renal pelvis, from which urine exits the kidney through the ureter. Nitrogen-containing waste products are excreted by the kidneys in mammals mainly in the form of urea.

The structure of the kidney differs between species. The kidneys can be unilobar (a single lobe represented by a single renal pyramid) or multilobar, unipapillary (a single or a common papilla), with several papillae or multipapillary, may be smooth-surfaced or lobulated. The multilobar kidneys can also be reniculate, which are found mainly in marine mammals. The unipapillary kidney with a single renal pyramid is the simplest type of kidney in mammals, from which the more structurally complex kidneys are believed to have evolved. Differences in kidney structure are the result of adaptations during evolution to variations in body mass and habitats (in particular, aridity) between species.

The cortex and medulla of the kidney contain nephrons, each of which consists of a glomerulus and a complex tubular system. The cortex contains glomeruli and is responsible for filtering the blood. The medulla is responsible for urine concentration and contains tubules with short and long loops of Henle. The loops of Henle are essential for urine concentration. Amongst the vertebrates, only mammals and birds have kidneys that can produce urine more concentrated (hypertonic) than the blood plasma, but only in mammals do all nephrons have the loop of Henle.

The kidneys of mammals are vital organs that maintain water, electrolyte and acid-base balance in the body, excrete nitrogenous waste products, regulate blood pressure, and participate in bone formation and regulation of glucose levels. The processes of blood plasma filtration, tubular reabsorption and tubular secretion occur in the kidneys, and urine formation is a result of these processes. The kidneys produce renin and erythropoietin hormones, and are involved in the conversion of vitamin D to its active form. Mammals are the only class of vertebrates in which only the kidneys are responsible for maintaining the homeostasis of the extracellular fluid in the body. The function of the kidneys is regulated by the autonomic nervous system and hormones.

The potential for regeneration in mature kidneys is limited because new nephrons cannot be formed. In cases of limited injury, renal function can be restored through compensatory mechanisms. The kidneys can have noninfectious and infectious diseases; in rare cases, congenital and hereditary anomalies occur in the kidneys of mammals. Pyelonephritis is usually caused by bacterial infections. Some diseases may be species-specific, and parasitic kidney diseases are common in some species. The structural characteristics of the mammalian kidneys make them vulnerable to ischemic and toxic injuries. Permanent damage can lead to chronic kidney disease. Ageing of the kidneys also causes changes in them, and the number of functioning nephrons decreases with age.

== Structure ==
=== Gross anatomy ===
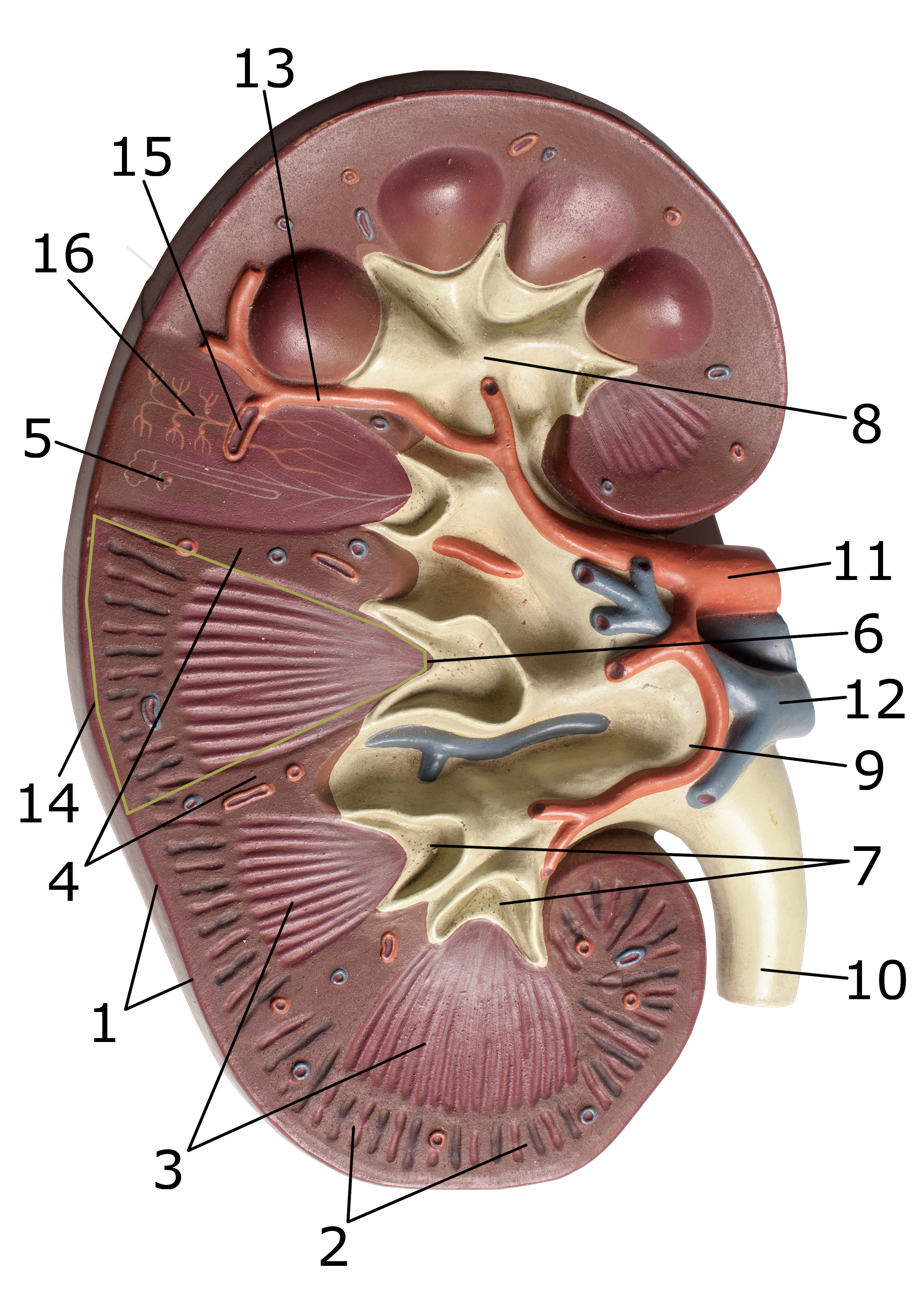
Didactic model of the multilobar mammalian kidney: 1. Fibrous capsule; 2. Cortex; 3. Renal pyramid of the medulla; 4. Renal column of the cortex; 5. Nephron; 6. Renal papilla; 7. Minor renal calyx; 8. Major renal calyx; 9. Renal pelvis; 10. Ureter; 11. Renal artery; 12. Renal vein; 13. Interlobar artery; 14. Renal lobe; 15. Arcuate artery; 16. Interlobular artery.

==== Location and shape ====
In mammals, the kidneys are usually bean-shaped; the shape is unique to mammals (fish, for example, have elongated kidneys). Some species have externally lobulated kidneys, as in marine mammals, bovines and bears. The lobulated kidneys of cetacians and pinnipeds have elongated oval shape. The concave part of the bean-shaped kidneys is called the renal hilum, through which the renal artery and nerves enter the kidney. The renal vein, collecting lymphatic vessels and ureter exit the kidney through the renal hilum.

The kidneys are located retroperitoneally on the back (dorsal) wall of the body of mammals. In the body, the kidney is surrounded or partially surrounded by a layer of fatty tissue (perirenal adipose capsule), which separates the kidney from the perirenal fascia.

==== General structure ====
The outer layer of each kidney is made up of a fibrous sheath called a renal capsule. The peripheral layer of the kidney is called the cortex, and the inner layer is called the medulla. The medulla consists of pyramids (also called malpighian pyramids), ascending with their base to the cortex and forming together with it the renal lobe. The pyramids are separated from each other by renal columns (Bertin's columns) formed by cortical tissue. The tips of the pyramids end with the renal papillae, from which urine is excreted into the calyces, pelvis, ureter, and, in most species, directly into the bladder, after which it is excreted through the urethra.

=== Parenchyma ===
Simplified structure of the mammalian kidney lobe: 1. Cortex; 2. Outer medulla; 3. Inner medulla; 4. Inner stripe; 5. Outer stripe; 6. Juxtamedullary nephron with long loop of Henle; 7. Medullary ray; 8. Renal capsule; 9. Renal papilla.; Podocytes Proximal convoluted tubule Proximal straight tubule Intermediate tubule (loop of Henle) Distal straight tubule Macula densa Distal convoluted tubule Connecting tubule Collecting duct

The parenchyma, being the functional part of the kidneys, is visually divided into cortex and medulla. The cortex itself is similar to the typical kidneys of less developed vertebrates, which cannot produce concentrated urine, while the medulla is the main site of urine concentration. The ratio of cortex to medulla varies between species, in domesticated animals the cortex usually occupies a third or fourth part of the parenchyma, while in desert animals it is only a fifth part. Increased renal medulla thickness is associated with greater urine concentrating ability in desert mammals.

The cortex and medulla are based on nephrons together with an extensive network of blood vessels and capillaries, as well as collecting ducts, into which nephrons empty, and renal interstitium. The nephron is composed of a renal corpuscle and a renal tubule. The renal corpuscle is a blood-filtering part of the nephron and is located in the cortex. The renal tubule extends from the renal corpuscle to the medulla into the loop of Henle and then returns back to the cortex. Finally, the renal tubule flows with its distal end into its collecting duct, which is common to several nephrons. The collecting ducts descend again into the medulla and fuse to wider collecting ducts, which pass through the inner medulla.

Based on the location of the renal corpuscle in the cortex, nephrons are classified into 3 types: superficial (closer to the renal capsule), midcortical (in the middle part of the cortex) and juxtamedullary (closer to the medulla) nephrons. Generally, they differ in the length of the loop of Henle. Superficial and midcortical nephrons typically have loops of Henle that are shorter than those of juxtamedullary nephrons. According to the length of the loop of Henle, nephrons are classified into nephrons with a long loop and with a short loop of Henle. Although those two classifications do not coincide. Usually, juxtamedullary nephrons have long loops of Henle, but there are more long-looped nephrons than juxtamedullary nephrons in the kidneys.

==== Cortex ====
Structurally, the cortex consists of cortical labyrinth and medullary rays. The cortical labyrinth contains interlobular arteries, vascular networks formed by afferent and efferent arterioles, renal corpuscles, proximal convoluted tubules, macula densa, distal convoluted tubules, connecting tubules and the initial parts of the collecting ducts. The proximal convoluted tubules predominate in the cortical labyrinth. The continuous layer of the cortex lying above the medullary rays is called the cortex corticis. Cortex corticis differs from the rest of the cortical labyrinth in that it does not contain glomeruli. Some mammals (for example, pig) have nephrons whose loops of Henle do not reach the medulla; such nephrons are called cortical nephrons. Cortical nephrons have a very short thin segment of the loop of Henle, and this segment may even be absent. The medullary rays of the cortex contain the proximal straight tubules, the cortical part of the thick ascending limb of the loops of Henle, and the cortical part of the collecting ducts. The cortex is divided into lobules, each of which is a medullary ray in conjunction with connected to it nephrons, and interlobular arteries that pass between the lobules.

==== Medulla ====
The medulla in mammals is divided into outer and inner regions. The outer region consists of short loops of Henle and collecting ducts, while the inner region consists of long loops and collecting ducts. The outer region is also subdivided into outer (lying directly under the cortex) and inner stripes. The stripes differ in that the outer stripe contains proximal straight tubules, while the inner stripe contains thin descending limbs of the loop of Henle (a section of the nephron following the proximal straight tubule).

The ability to produce more concentrated urine is associated with the length of the inner medulla (with its long loops of Henle). Most mammalian species have nephrons with both short and long loops of Henle, while some species may have only one type. For example, mountain beavers have only nephrons with a short loop, and, accordingly, there is no inner medulla in the kidneys and their ability to concentrate urine is low. Dogs and cats, on the other hand, have only long-loop nephrons with an average ability to concentrate urine. The ratio of nephrons with short loops of Henle to those with long loops also varies between species. Previously, it was mistakenly believed that species with the highest urine concentration ability have only long-looped nephrons. But the kidney of species with high ability to concentrate urine have more short-looped nephrons than long-looped nephrons, so the highest concentration ability requires both types of nephrons.

=== Variations ===
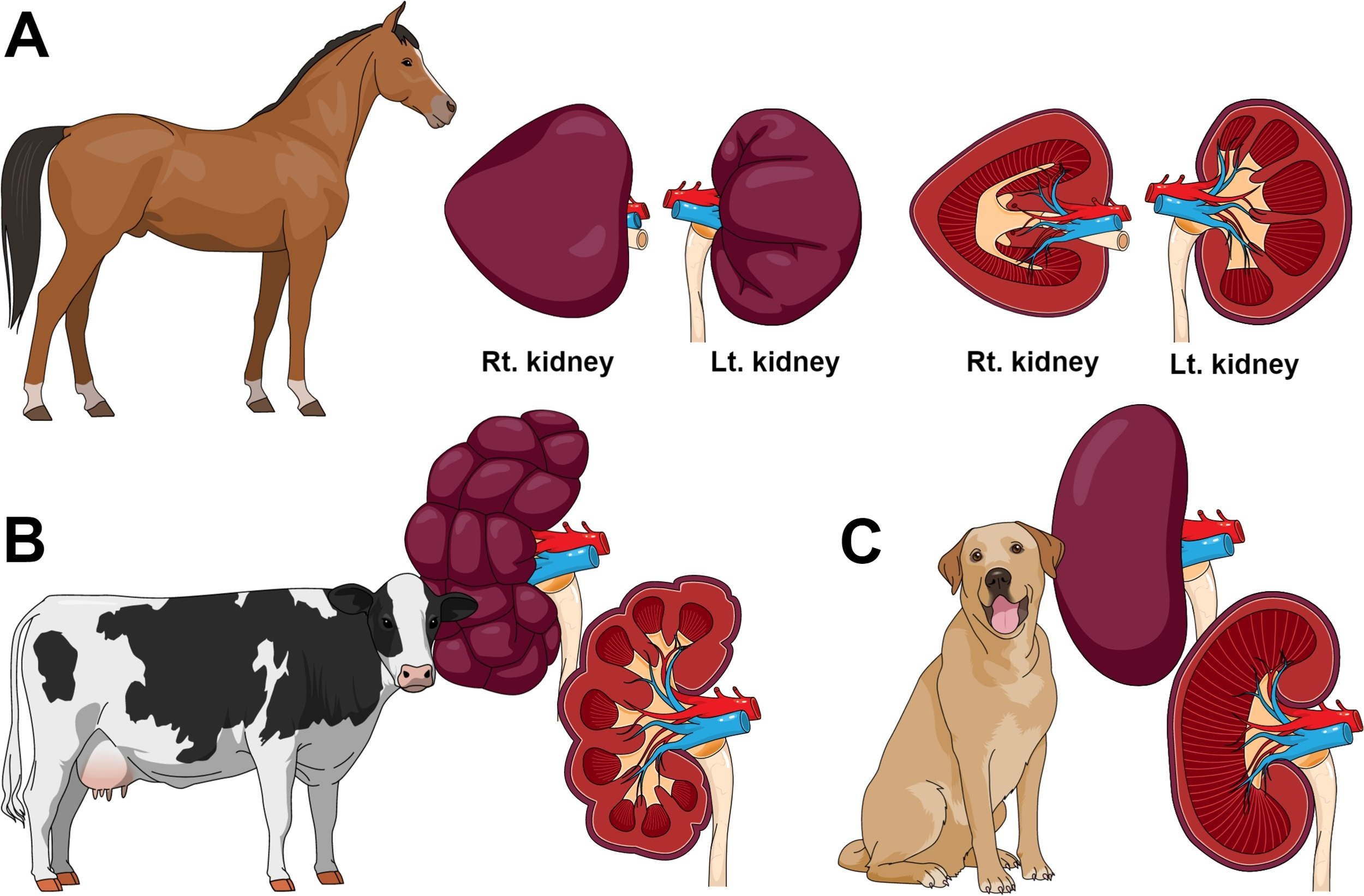
Variation of the kidney between domestic mammalian species: (A) Equine kidneys with heart-shaped right kidney; (B) Bovine kidneys with lobulated cortex and fused medulla; (C) Canine bean-shaped kidneys.

Structurally, kidneys vary between mammals. What structural type a particular species will have depends generally on the body mass of the animals. Small mammals have unilobar kidneys with a compact structure and a single renal papilla. Larger animals have multilobar kidneys, such as those of bovines. By itself, the lobe is equivalent to a simple unipapillary kidney, as in rats or mice. Bovine kidneys also lack a renal pelvis; urine from the major calyces is excreted directly into the ureter.

Kidneys can be unipapillary, as in rats and mice, with few renal papillae, as in spider monkeys, or with many, as in pigs and humans. Most animals have single renal papilla. In some animals, such as horses, the tips of the renal pyramids fuse with each other to form a common renal papilla, called the renal crest. Such kidneys are called crest kidneys and are also considered unipapillary kidneys (an enlarged modification). The crest kidneys usually appear in species larger than the rabbit (for example, in monkeys and camels).

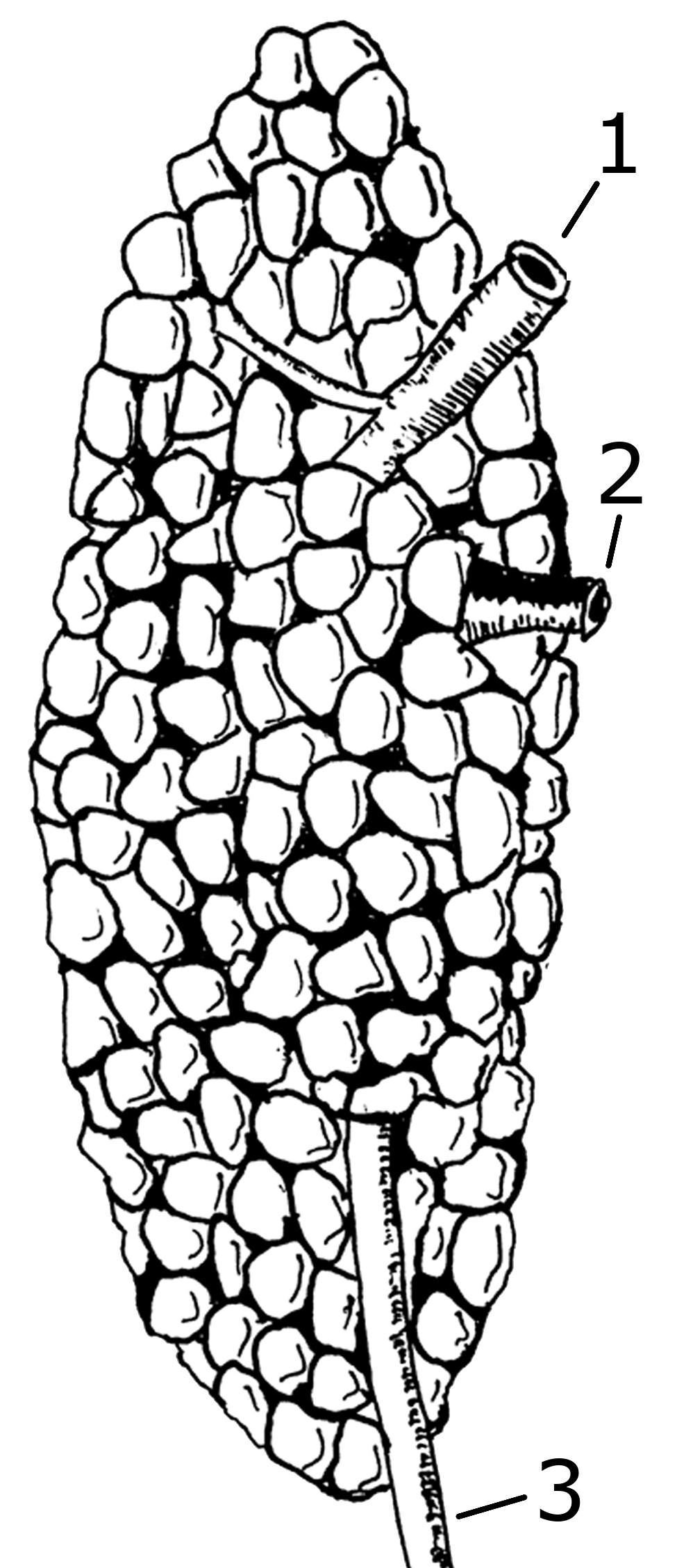
Author's drawing of a dolphin reniculate kidney: 1. Renal artery; 2. Renal vein; 3. Common collecting duct that becomes the ureter.

The kidneys of the marine mammals, otters and bears are reniculate. The reniculate kidneys consist of small reniculi, each of which is comparable by its structure to a simple unipapillary kidney. The kidneys of marine mammals can have hundreds or thousands of reniculi, each with its own cortex, medulla, and calyx. For example, each whale kidney consists of about 7000 renculi which join a common collective system. However, the kidneys of manatees are actually multilobar, because their cortex is continuous rather than discrete.

The size of the kidneys increases with the mass of mammals, and the number of nephrons in the kidneys between mammals increases allometrically. In mice, the kidneys are approximately 1 cm (0.4 in) long, weighing 400 mg, with 16,000 nephrons, while in the killer whale, the kidney length exceeds 25 cm (10 in), the mass is approximately 4.5 kg (10 lb), with the number of nephrons of the order of 10,000,000. At the same time, the killer whale kidneys are reniculate, with each renicule about 430 mg in weight and 1 cm (0.4 in) in length, making renicule of the killer whale similar to the kidney of a mouse not only in structure, but also in size and mass.

=== Microanatomy ===
By microanatomic structure, the kidney can be divided into several main elements: interstitium, renal corpuscles, tubules, and vasculature. The interstitium is the cells and extracellular matrix in the space between the glomeruli, vessels, tubules, and collecting ducts. The interstitial space surrounding cells is filled with interstitial fluid. The interstitium between the tubules contains fibroblasts, dendritic cells, macrophages and lymphocytes. Cortical interstitium also includes the endothelial cells of the lymphatic capillaries, which are considered part of the interstitium due to the lack of a basement membrane. Interstitial fibroblasts form the tissue skeleton of the kidney. Blood vessels, nerves and lymphatic vessels run through the interstitium. The nephron, together with the collecting duct into which it empties, is called the uriniferous tubule. Each uriniferous tubule, along with the vasculature supplying it, is embedded in the interstitium.

Approximately 18–26 different cell types have been described in mammalian kidneys, with a large variation in the range due to a lack of consensus on what counts as a particular cell type, and likely to species differences. Renal corpuscles are composed of four cell types: fenestrated endothelium, mesangial cells, podocytes and parietal epithelial cells of Bowman's capsule. At least 16 different cell types make up the renal tubules. The tubules themselves are divided into at least 14 segments, which differ in cell types and functions. The normal functioning of the kidneys is provided by the complex of epithelial, endothelial, interstitial and immune cells.

=== Blood supply ===
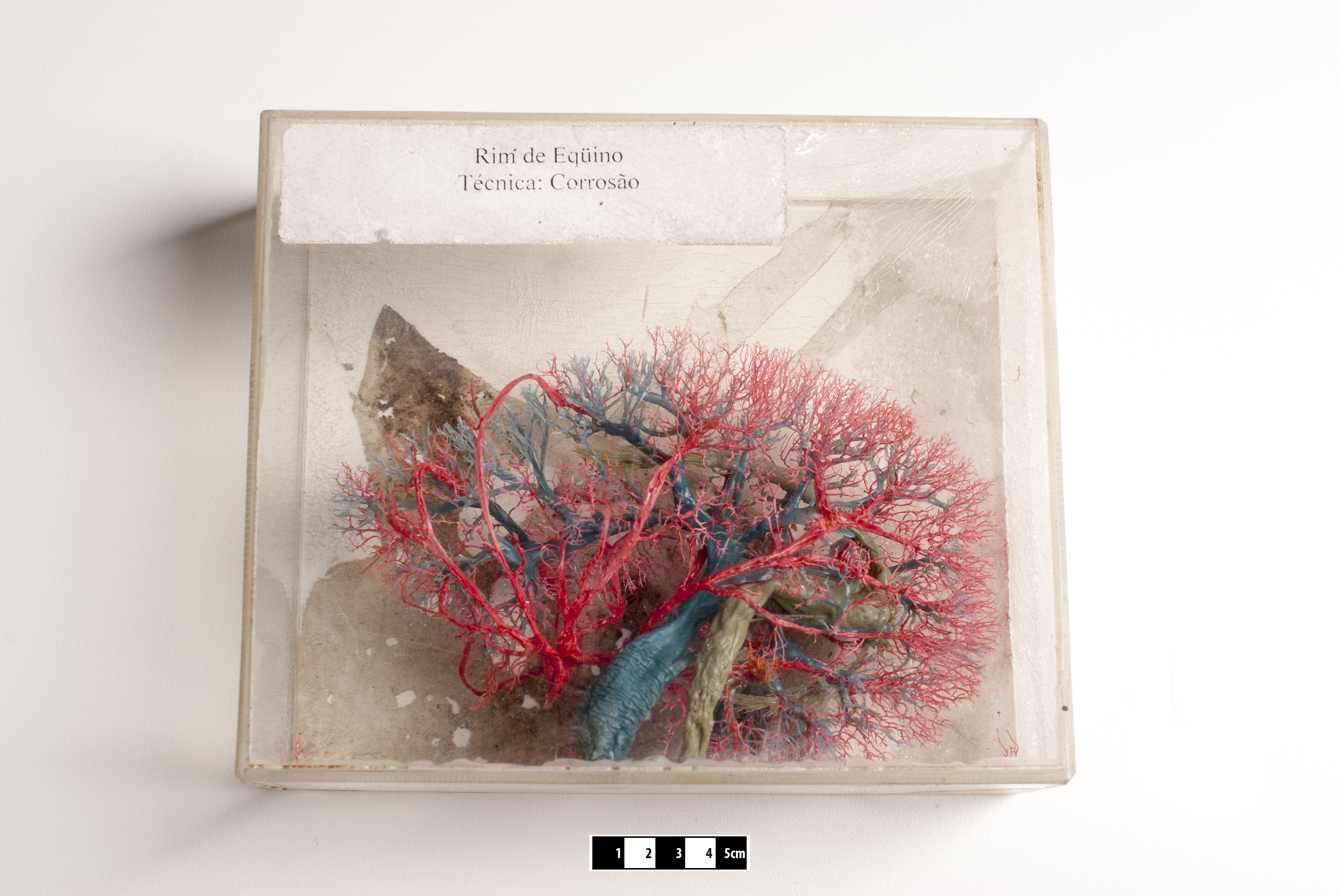
Equine kidney blood supply

The mammalian kidney is the organ that has the most complex vascular blood system compared to other organs. Despite their small size, the kidneys of mammals account for a significant part of the minute volume of blood circulation. It is believed that in land mammals, about a fifth of the volume of blood that passes through the heart passes through the kidneys. In adult mice, for example, minute volume is about 9%–22%.

Blood enters the kidney through the renal artery, which in the multilobar kidney branches in the area of the renal pelvis into large interlobar arteries that pass through the renal columns. The interlobar arteries branch at the base of the pyramid, giving rise to arcuate arteries, from which the interlobular arteries extend into the cortex. The interlobar arteries supply the pyramids and the adjacent cortex with an extensive network of blood vessels. The cortex itself is heavily permeated with arteries, while there are no arteries in the medulla. The venous flow of blood runs back parallel to the arteries. In some species, there are veins isolated from the arteries under the capsule in the cortex, which in humans are called stellate veins. These veins flow into the interlobular veins. The renal portal system is absent in mammals, with the exception of monotremes. Mammals are the only class of vertebrates (with exception of some species) that does not have a renal portal system.

The vascular glomeruli of nephrons receive blood from afferent arterioles, which originate in the interlobular arteries with intermediate formation of prearterioles. Each afferent arteriole divides into several renal glomeruli. Then these glomeruli join into the efferent arteriole, into which filtered blood goes from the nephrons. In nephrons with a long loop of Henle, the efferent arterioles branch, forming straight vessels called vasa recta, which descend into the medulla. The descending vasa recta, ascending vasa recta vessels, and the loop of Henle together form the countercurrent system of the kidney. In the afferent arteriole, blood is supplied at high pressure, which promotes filtration, and in the efferent arteriole, it is at low pressure, which promotes reabsorption.

=== Lymphatic drainage ===
The kidney is well supplied with lymphatic vessels, which remove excess fluid with substances and macromolecules dissolved in it from the interstitium that fills the space between the tubules and blood vessels. The anatomy of the lymphatic system of the kidney is similar between mammals. Lymphatics basically follow the path of blood vessels.

The lymphatic system of the kidneys begins in the cortex with the initial blind-end intralobular lymphatic capillaries passing near the tubules and renal corpuscles, but the lymphatic vessels do not go inside the renal corpuscles. The intralobular lymphatic capillaries are connected to the arcuate lymphatics. The arcuate lymphatics pass into the interlobar lymphatics, which pass near the interlobar arteries. The arcuate and interlobar lymphatics are lymphatic precollectors. Finally, the interlobar lymphatics join the collecting hilar lymphatics leaving the kidney through renal hilum. Lymphatic vessels are usually absent in the medulla of the mammalian kidneys, and the role of lymphatic vessels is assumed to be performed by vasa recta.

In some species, there may be differences in the anatomy of the lymphatic system of the kidney. For example, sheep lack lymphatics in the renal capsule, and rabbits lack interlobular lymphatics. Most studies fail to detect lymphatic vessels in the renal medulla of animals; in particular, they are not found in sheep and rats. However, some studies have found lymphatic vessels in the renal medulla of pigs and rabbits. Depending on the species, there may or may not also be a connection between the lymphatics of the renal capsule and the internal renal lymphatic system.

=== Nerve supply ===
The innervation of the kidney is provided by efferent sympathetic nerve fibers entering the kidney through the renal hilum, originating in the celiac plexus, and afferent, leaving the kidney to the spinal ganglion. There is no reliable evidence for the innervation of the kidney by parasympathetic nerves, while the existing evidence is controversial. Efferent sympathetic nerve fibers reach the renal vasculature, renal tubules, juxtaglomerular cells, and the wall of the renal pelvis, all parts of the nephron are innervated by sympathetic nerves. Nerve fibers pass through the connective tissue around the arteries and arterioles. In the medulla, the descending vasa recta are innervated as long as they contain smooth muscle cells. Most afferent nerve fibers are located in the renal pelvis. The vast majority of nerves in the kidneys are unmyelinated.

Normal physiological stimulation of the efferent sympathetic nerves of the kidney is involved in maintaining the balance of water and sodium in the body. Activation of the efferent sympathetic nerves of the kidney reduces its blood flow, and respectively, filtration and excretion of sodium in the urine, and also increases the rate of renin secretion. The afferent nerves in the kidney are also involved in maintaining balance. Mechanosensory nerves of the kidney are activated by stretching of the tissue of the renal pelvis, which can occur with an increase in the rate of urine flow from the kidney, resulting in a reflex decrease in the activity of efferent sympathetic nerves. That is, activation of the afferent nerves in the kidney suppresses the activity of the efferent nerves.

== Functions ==
=== Excretory function ===
In mammals, nitrogenous metabolic products are excreted predominantly in the form of urea, which is the end by-product of mammalian protein metabolism and is highly soluble in water. Most of the urea is excreted by the kidneys. Blood filtration, as in other vertebrates, occurs in the renal glomeruli, where pressurized blood passes through a permeable barrier that filters out blood cells and large protein molecules, forming primary urine. The filtered primary urine is osmotically and ionically the same as blood plasma. In the tubules of the nephron, substances useful for the body, dissolved in the primary urine, are subsequently reabsorbed, as the urine is being concentrated.

=== Osmoregulation ===
The mammalian kidneys maintain an almost constant level of plasma osmolarity. The main component of blood plasma, which determines its osmolarity, is sodium and its anions. The key role in maintaining a constant level of osmolarity is managed by the control of the ratio of sodium and water in the blood. Drinking large amounts of water can dilute the blood plasma. To remove excess water but keep salt in the blood, the kidneys produce more dilute urine than the plasma. If too little water is consumed, then urine is excreted more concentrated than blood plasma. The concentration of urine is provided by an osmotic gradient that increases from the border between the cortex and medulla to the top of the pyramid of the medulla.

In addition to the kidneys, the hypothalamus and neurohypophysis are involved in the regulation of water balance through a feedback system. The osmoreceptors of the hypothalamus respond to an increase in the osmolarity of the blood plasma, as a result of which the secretion of vasopressin by the posterior pituitary gland is stimulated, and thirst also arises. The kidneys respond via receptors to increased levels of vasopressin by increasing water reabsorption. As a result, plasma osmolarity decreases due to its dilution with water.

Variation in the rate of water excretion is an important survival function for mammals that have limited access to water. The loop of Henle is the most prominent feature of the mammalian kidney. These loops provide the most efficient way to reabsorb water and create concentrated urine, allowing mammals to save water in their bodies. After passing through the loop of Henle, the fluid becomes hypertonic relative to the blood plasma. Mammalian kidneys combine nephrons with short and long loops of Henle. The ability to concentrate urine is determined mainly by the structure of the medulla and the length of the loops of Henle.

=== Endocrine function ===
In addition to excretory, the kidneys also perform an endocrine function, they produce certain hormones. The juxtaglomerular cells of the kidneys produce renin, which is a key regulator of the renin–angiotensin system, which is responsible for blood pressure regulation.

The production of erythropoietin by the kidneys is responsible for the differentiation of erythroid progenitor cells in the bone marrow into erythrocytes and is induced by hypoxia. Thus, with a lack of oxygen, the number of red blood cells in the blood increases, and they are responsible for transporting oxygen.

The kidneys are involved in the metabolism of vitamin D. In the liver, vitamin D is converted to calcifediol (25OHD), while the kidneys convert calcifediol to calcitriol (1,25(OH)_{2}D), which is the active form of the vitamin and is essentially a hormone. Vitamin D is involved in the formation of bones and cartilage, and also performs a number of other functions, for example, it is involved in the functioning of the immune system.

=== Blood pressure regulation ===
Some mammalian internal organs, including the kidneys and lung, are designed to function within normal blood pressure levels and normal blood volume levels, and blood pressure itself is also affected by changes in blood volume levels. Therefore, maintaining a constant blood volume for mammals is a very important function of the body. The stable level of blood volume is influenced by the glomerular filtration rate, the function of individual parts of the nephron, the sympathetic nervous system and the renin-angiotensin-aldosterone system.

In the walls of the afferent arterioles at the entrance to the renal glomeruli, there are juxtaglomerular cells. These cells are sensitive to changes in the minute volume of blood circulation, and to the composition and volume of the extracellular fluid, producing renin in response to changes in their level. Once in the bloodstream, renin converts angiotensinogen to angiotensin I. Angiotensin I is further cleaved by the angiotensin-converting enzyme to angiotensin II, which is a potent vasoconstrictor that increases blood pressure. In addition to angiotensin II, other biologically active substances can be formed in mammals. Angiotensin II can be cleaved to angiotensin III, angiotensin IV and angiotensin (1–7).

=== Acid-base balance ===
Maintaining acid-base balance is vital because changes in pH levels affect virtually every biological process in the body. In a typical mammal, a normal average pH level is around 7.4. As in the case of other vertebrates in mammals, the acid-base balance is maintained mainly by the bicarbonate buffer system (HCO_{3}^{−}/CO_{2}), which allows maintaining a constant pH level of the blood and extracellular fluid. This buffer system is described by the following equation:

$$\ce{HCO_3^- + H+ <=> H2CO3 <=> CO2 + H2O}$$

The regulation of the acid-base balance through the bicarbonate buffer system is provided by the lungs and kidneys. The lungs regulate CO_{2} (carbon dioxide) level, while the kidneys regulate HCO_{3}^{−} and H^{+} (bicarbonate and hydrogen ions). The kidneys play a key role in maintaining a constant level of acid-base balance in mammals. In the glomeruli, HCO_{3}^{−} is completely filtered into primary urine. To maintain a constant pH, the kidneys reabsorb almost all of the HCO_{3}^{−} from primary urine back into the bloodstream and secrete H^{+} into the urine, oxidizing the urine.

Reabsorption of HCO_{3}^{−} occurs in the proximal tubule, in the ascending limb of the loop of Henle, and to a lesser extent in the distal convoluted tubule of the nephron. H^{+} secretion is carried out mainly through Na^{+}/H^{+} exchangers in the tubules of the nephron. The collecting ducts are involved in the energy-dependent secretion of H^{+}. When H^{+} ions enter the urine, they can combine with filtered HCO_{3}^{−} to form carbonic acid H_{2}CO_{3}, which is being converted into CO_{2} and H_{2}O (water) by the luminal carbonic anhydrase. The formed CO_{2} diffuses into the cells of the tubules, where it combines with H_{2}O with the help of cytosolic carbonic anhydrase and forms HCO_{3}^{−}, which then returns to the bloodstream, and the formed H^{+} ion is secreted into the urine. Some of the H^{+} ions are secreted at an energy cost through an ATP-dependent mechanism.

The excreted urine is slightly acidic. The excretion of H^{+} together with urine also occurs through buffer systems, in particular, NH_{4}^{+} (ammonium). Only a small amount of NH_{4}^{+} is filtered through the glomerulus; most of the ammonium excreted is the result of H^{+} ion oxidation of NH_{3} (ammonia) formed in the cells of the proximal convoluted tubule, which is secreted into the lumen of the tubule either as NH_{3} or as NH_{4}^{+}. The formation of ammonia is also accompanied by the formation of new HCO_{3}^{−}, which replenishes the extracellular buffer system. In the thick ascending tubule of the loop of Henle, on the contrary, NH_{4}^{+} is absorbed, which causes its accumulation in the interstitium. The final stage of urine oxidation occurs in the collecting ducts, where H^{+} ions are secreted with the involvement of ATP, and NH_{3} is transported from the interstitium and secreted into the urine, where NH_{3} is oxidized by H^{+} to form NH_{4}^{+}. By regulating HCO_{3}^{−} reabsorption and H^{+} secretion, the kidneys help maintain blood pH homeostasis.

=== Glucose homeostasis ===
Together with the liver, the kidneys are involved in maintaining glucose homeostasis in the body of mammals. The processes of filtration, reabsorption and consumption of glucose, as well as the production of glucose through gluconeogenesis, occur in the kidneys. Glucose consumption (glycolysis) occurs primarily in the medulla, while gluconeogenesis occurs in the cortex. Hormonally, the process of gluconeogenesis in the kidneys is regulated by insulin and catecholamines.

== Evolution ==
=== Mammalian metanephric kidney ===
The first mammals are believed to have appeared during the Permian period, which was characterized by cold nights in arid deserts and a strong seasonality with long, cold winters. It is likely that cold and aridity were significant factors of evolutionary pressure at that time. The development of warm-bloodedness in protomammals could lead to an increase in the intensity of blood circulation, and, accordingly, to an increase in blood pressure, which, in turn, increased the glomerular filtration rate of the kidneys. However, an increase in the glomerular filtration rate would also lead to an increase in the removal rate of water from the body. All mammals have a thin segment of the tubule that is part of the loop of Henle. This segment is responsible for the concentration of urine and the reabsorption of water. It can be assumed that the development of a water reabsorption mechanism could be part of the evolution of warm-bloodedness, rather than a direct adaptation to aridity.

=== Adaptations to aridity ===
The ability to produce more concentrated urine is inversely dependent on the body mass of the mammals, that is, the smaller the mass of the animal, the more concentrated urine relative to animals with a larger mass its kidneys could produce during adaptation to an arid environment. Some desert animals have evolved greater ability to concentrate urine than other animals. The most concentrated urine among the studied species is produced by the Australian hopping mouse Notomys alexis, whose kidneys have longer loops of Henley and an elongated renal papilla compared to the kidneys of other mammals. The longer loops of Henley in the Australian hopping mouse make it possible to produce very concentrated urine and survive in conditions of water scarcity.

=== Adaptations to body mass ===
One of the key factors that determine the shape and morphology of the kidneys in mammals is their mass. The simplest type of kidney in mammals is the unipapillary kidney, consisting of a cortex, medulla, and renal pelvis. But the unipapillary kidney is limited by the number of nephrons at which it functions optimally. It is assumed that unipapillary kidney was the original kidney structure in mammals, from which multilobar kidneys evolved.

More complex multilobar kidneys likely emerged as an adaptation to the increased body mass of mammals and the corresponding need for an increase in the number of nephrons in the kidneys. A further adaptation mechanism is an increase in the size of the renal glomeruli in large mammals (and, accordingly, an increase in the length of the tubules), as in elephants, in which the diameter of the glomerulus can be two times larger than in killer whales. The appearance of reniculate kidneys was probably the result of adaptation to both an increase in body mass and habitats.

=== Reniculate kidneys ===
Reniculate kidneys are typical mainly for marine mammals. They are believed to be an adaptation both to the large body mass, allowing the number of nephrons to increase by increasing the number of renculi, and to a diet with large amounts of saline water, as well as an adaptation for long-term diving. Reniculate kidneys probably allow the number of nephrons to be increased by adding renculi without the need to increase tubule length as the organ size increases. Consumption of excess salt in marine mammals leads to intracellular dehydration, resulting in a need for rapid removal of excess salt from the body, which in the case of reniculate kidneys is facilitated by an increase in the total surface area between the cortex and medulla. The need to dive for long periods of time requires a reduction in the body's oxygen consumption, while the kidneys are an energy-consuming organ, so the glomerular filtration rate decreases during diving. In contrast, the glomerular filtration rate is very high between dives.

== Development ==
=== Stages of kidney development ===
In mammals, kidney development during embryonic period proceeds through three stages, with different type of kidney developing at each stage: pronephros, mesonephros and metanephros. All three kidney types develop from the intermediate mesoderm sequentially in the cranio-caudal direction (in the direction from the side of the head to the tail of the body). First, the pronephros is formed, which is considered rudimentary in mammals, that is, it does not function. Then, caudal to the pronephros, the mesonephros develops, which is the functioning kidney of the embryo. Subsequently, the mesonephros degrades in females, and in males it participates in the development of the reproductive system. The third stage is the formation of the metanephros in the caudal part of the embryo. The metanephric kidney is the definitive (permanent) mammalian kidney, which persists in adults.

=== Metanephros development ===
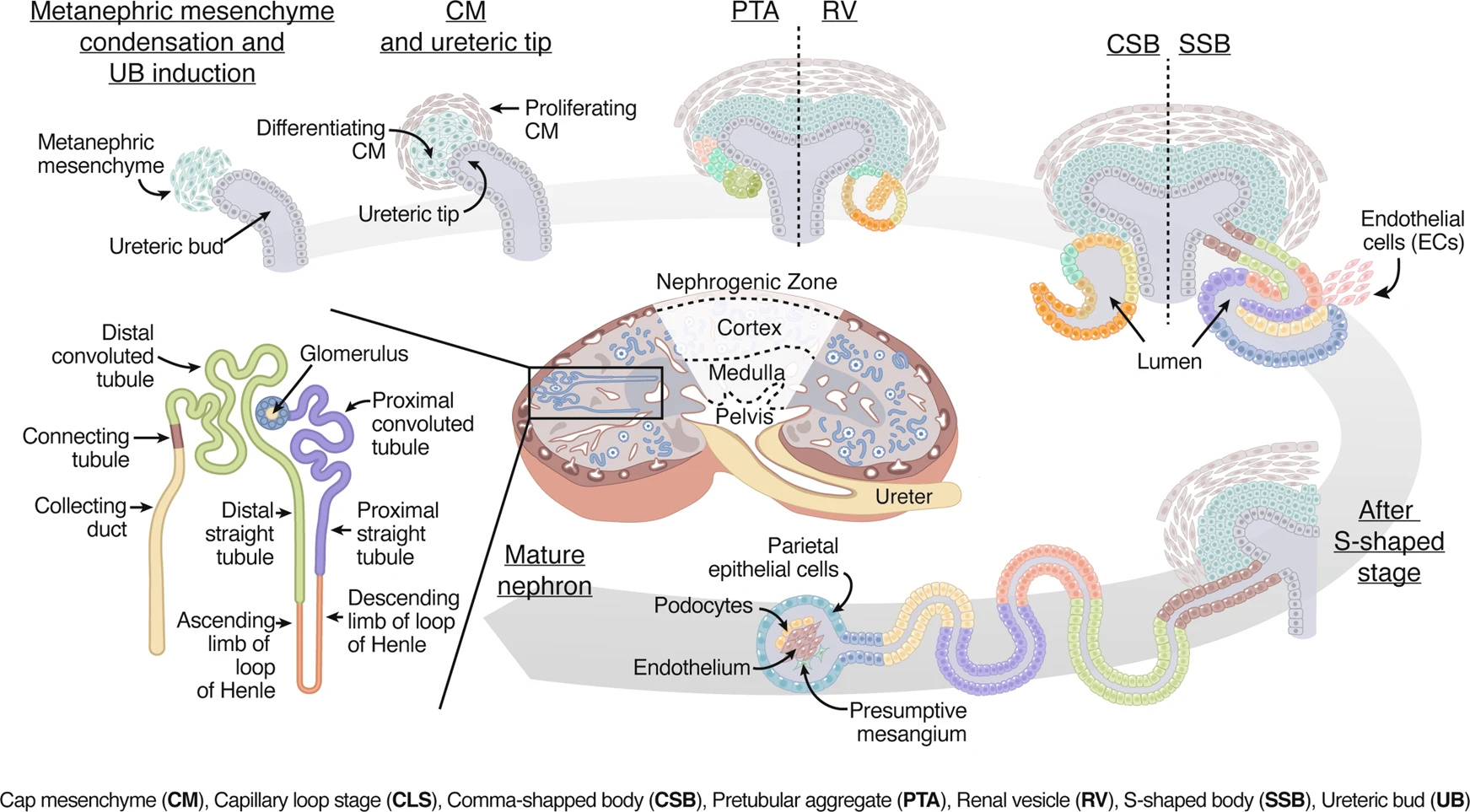
Schematic representation of nephrogenesis during embryologic development following induction of cap mesenchyme by the ureteric bud.

The metanephros develops from the ureteric bud, which is an outgrowth on the caudal part of the nephric duct, and the metanephrogenic blastema, which is part of the intermediate mesoderm surrounding the ureteral bud. The development of metanephros begins with the induction of a metanephrogenic blastema by the ureteric bud. While the kidney develops, the metanephrogenic blastema and ureteric bud reciprocally induce each other. Growing into the mesoderm, the ureteric bud branches and transforms into a tree structure that will eventually become the ureter, renal pelvis, major and minor calyces, renal papillae, and collecting ducts. At the same time, at the tips of the collecting ducts, the mesoderm differentiates into epithelial cells that form nephron tubules (processes of epithelialization and tubulogenesis occur). Vascular system of the kidney is also developed with the development of nephrons, with large vessels branching from the dorsal aorta.

In some mammals, kidney organogenesis ends before birth, while in others it may continue for some time into the postpartum period (for example, in rodents it ends about a week after birth). When the formation of new nephrons (nephrogenesis) ends, the number of nephrons in the kidney becomes final.

=== Postnatal maturation ===
After birth and in the postnatal period, the kidneys are functionally immature; functional development of the kidneys in all mammals lags behind the anatomical development. In the postnatal period, the mass of the tubules is not large enough, so the ability to reabsorb fluids is reduced compared to the kidneys of adult mammals. During this period, hypertrophy and hyperplasia of the tubules occurs, and the kidneys increase in size. The period during which fully functional kidneys form varies significantly between mammalian species. In rats, the kidneys quickly become fully functional, while in monkeys it takes five months.

== Injury and diseases ==
Kidney diseases or disorders may be congenital, inherited, non-infectious, and infectious. Diseases vary between mammalian species. Some diseases may be specific only to some species, while the others may be more common in one species and less common in another. For example, chronic progressive nephropathy is common in mice, rats and naked mole-rats, but at the same time there is no analogous disease in humans.

=== Congenital and inherited anomalies ===
Congenital anomalies and hereditary disorders of the kidneys among mammals are rare, but can have a significant impact on kidney function, in some cases they can cause death in the early neonatal period. Among the anomalies of kidney development are hypoplasia and dysplasia of the kidneys (dysplasia can be unilateral or bilateral), agenesis (absence) of one or both kidneys, polycystic kidney disease, simple renal cysts, perirenal pseudocysts, doubled or tripled renal arteries, malposition of the kidneys, horseshoe kidney and nephroblastoma.

=== Non-infectious diseases ===
Non-infectious diseases of the kidney include acute kidney injury, chronic kidney disease, glomerular diseases and tubular diseases (renal tubular acidosis, Fanconi syndrome and renal glycosuria). In small mammals, renal neoplasms are rare but usually are not benign. Renal neoplasms and abscesses are rare in ruminants. Obstructive uropathy (obstruction of urine flow from one or both kidneys) can lead to hydronephrosis with dilatation of the renal pelvis. Kidney stones can also be formed in the kidneys (nephrolithiasis).

The cause of acute kidney injury in most cases is ischemic or toxic injury. Mammalian kidneys are susceptible to ischemic injury because mammals lack a renal-portal system, and as a result, vascular vasoconstriction in the glomeruli can lead to decreased blood supply to the entire kidney. The kidneys are susceptible to toxic injury, since toxins are reabsorbed in the tubules along with most of the filtered substances. The kidneys are able to restore their functionality after acute injury, but it also can progress into chronic kidney disease. Chronic kidney disease is characterised by loss of function of the kidney tissues, and the disease is usually progressive.

=== Infectious diseases ===
Kidney infections in small mammals are usually caused by aerobic bacteria, including Escherichia coli, staphylococci, enterococci, and streptococci. Fungal and parasitic infections of the kidney are rare in small mammals. Pyelonephritis is usually caused by bacteria that enter the kidney through the ascending route from the lower parts of the urinary system, in rare cases through the blood (descending hematogenous route). In ruminants, pyelonephritis is most often caused by the bacteria Corynebacterium renale and Escherichia coli. Fish-eating mammals (such as minks and dogs) can become infected with the giant kidney worm Dioctophyme renale. Pigs can become infected with the Stephanurus dentatus worm, which is found throughout the world, but is more common in the tropics and subtropics. Kidney infections are considered rare among marine mammals.

=== Ageing ===
After maturation, the kidneys slowly begin to undergo ageing processes, which are characterized by changes in anatomy, physiology, function and regenerative capabilities. During the life of mammals, glomerulosclerosis affects glomeruli, the basement membrane thickens, the tubules undergo atrophic changes, and the renal interstitium fibrosis increases. The number of functioning nephrons gradually decreases throughout the life. In terms of function, the glomerular filtration rate decreases and the ability to concentrate urine decreases, too. Age-related changes themselves may not be noticeable and may not lead to kidney failure or disease, but are a risk factor for kidney or urinary tract diseases.

== Repair and regeneration ==
Unlike more primitive vertebrates such as fish, in mammals nephrogenesis ends before or some time after birth, caused by the loss of the condensed mesenchyme of the metanephrogenic blastema. As a result, new nephrons cannot form in adults, and after injuries, the kidneys of adult mammals cannot regenerate through the formation of new nephrons. However, kidneys have other compensatory and regenerative mechanisms for restoring their function.

=== Compensatory capabilities ===
In the case of unilateral nephrectomy, the load on the remaining kidney increases, increasing the rate of filtration and reabsorption and leading to changes in the nephrons themselves. The renal glomerulus may double or triple in diameter. These compensatory changes are similar to the changes in nephrons that occur after birth as the kidney grows. Resection of kidney tissue also does not cause kidney regeneration; however, compensatory changes can also occur after kidney damage if it leads to a significant decrease in the number of nephrons in the kidneys.

=== Nephron regeneration ===
Within a single nephron, regenerative abilities differ between its parts. In acute toxic and ischemic injuries, the tubules are able to regenerate and restore the function of the nephron. In particular, the proximal part of the nephron, through which up to two-thirds of the primary urine is absorbed, has the ability to regenerate. This part of the nephron in mammals is most at risk of ischemic or toxic damage. In addition, the repair of nephrons occurs in the course of normal physiological activity throughout the life due to the shedding of tubular epithelial cells. The glomerulus has a complex structure, and its ability to recover after injury is limited. Mesangial and endothelial cells are able to proliferate and restore their population after injury. On the contrary, podocytes do not proliferate under normal conditions.

=== Healing after injury ===
If minor damage to the nephron tubules occurs, the lost cells are replaced by new ones, and the epithelium regenerates, restoring its structure and function. In moderate to severe injuries with large cell loss, the chances of regeneration of the tubular epithelium are reduced. In such cases, damage leads to inflammatory and fibrotic responses, and regenerative tissue repair is impaired. Such a reaction is typical for acute kidney injury. Fibrosis is the second line of body defences, which was supposed to reduce possible hemorrhage and fight possible infection during the evolution of mammals. Renal fibrosis is the result of failed kidney healing and associated with renal dysfunction, but it was suggested that it might support survival of non-injured and partially injured nephrons. Chronic kidney injury is characterized by fibrosis, scarring, and loss of tissue function.

== See also ==
- Human kidney – an example of mammalian kidney that filters blood in humans

== Bibliography ==
Books

- P. C. Withers; C. E. Cooper; S. K. Maloney; F. Bozinovic; A. P. Cruz-Neto (2016). Ecological and Environmental Physiology of Mammals. Oxford University Press. ISBN 978-0-19-964271-7. OCLC 990319645. OL 28616170M. Wikidata Q115609411.
- Dellmann, Horst-Dieter (2006). Jo Ann Eurell; Brian L. Frappier (eds.). Dellmann's Textbook of Veterinary Histology (6th ed.). Blackwell Publishing. ISBN 978-0-7817-4148-4. LCCN 2005008748. OL 3396442M. Wikidata Q117031679.
- M. A. Breshears; A. W. Confer (2017). "Chapter 11 - The Urinary System". In J. F. Zachary (ed.). Pathologic Basis of Veterinary Disease (6th ed.). St. Louis: Elsevier. pp. 617–681.e1. ISBN 978-0-323-35775-3. LCCN 2016021411. OL 29308602M. Wikidata Q115689725. Archived from the original on 30 July 2022.
- Dantzler, William (2016). Comparative Physiology of the Vertebrate Kidney (2nd ed.). Springer. ISBN 978-1-4939-3734-9. OL 35801957M. Wikidata Q115604361.
- R. J. Alpern; M. Caplan; O. W. Moe, eds. (2012). Seldin and Giebisch's The Kidney: Physiology and pathophysiology. Illustrator: Unknown (5th ed.). Amsterdam: Academic Press. ISBN 978-0-12-381463-0. LCCN 2013372122. OCLC 827261790. OL 34609694M. Wikidata Q114595502.
  - D. Eladari; U. Hasler; E. Féraille (2012). "Chapter 3 - Renal Ion-Translocating ATPases". In R. J. Alpern; M. Caplan; O. W. Moe (eds.). Seldin and Giebisch's The Kidney: Physiology and pathophysiology. Vol. 1–2. Illustrator: Unknown (5th ed.). Amsterdam: Academic Press. pp. 84–85. ISBN 978-0-12-381463-0. LCCN 2013372122. OCLC 827261790. OL 34609694M. Wikidata Q114595502.
  - Kriz W.; Kaissling B. (2012). "Chapter 20 - Structural Organization of the Mammalian Kidney". In R. J. Alpern; M. Caplan; O. W. Moe (eds.). Seldin and Giebisch's The Kidney: Physiology and pathophysiology. Vol. 1–2. Illustrator: Unknown (5th ed.). Amsterdam: Academic Press. pp. 595–691. ISBN 978-0-12-381463-0. LCCN 2013372122. OCLC 827261790. OL 34609694M. Wikidata Q114595502.
  - Kevin T. Bush; Hiroyuki Sakurai; Sanjay K. Nigam (2012). "Chapter 25 - Molecular and Cellular Mechanisms of Kidney Development". In R. J. Alpern; M. Caplan; O. W. Moe (eds.). Seldin and Giebisch's The Kidney: Physiology and pathophysiology. Vol. 1–2. Illustrator: Unknown (5th ed.). Amsterdam: Academic Press. ISBN 978-0-12-381463-0. LCCN 2013372122. OCLC 827261790. OL 34609694M. Wikidata Q114595502.
  - J. M. Sands; H. E. Layton (2012). "Chapter 43 - Urine Concentrating Mechanism and Urea Transporters". In R. J. Alpern; M. Caplan; O. W. Moe (eds.). Seldin and Giebisch's The Kidney: Physiology and pathophysiology. Vol. 1–2. Illustrator: Unknown (5th ed.). Amsterdam: Academic Press. ISBN 978-0-12-381463-0. LCCN 2013372122. OCLC 827261790. OL 34609694M. Wikidata Q114595502.
- Ulla C. Kopp (20 August 2011), Neural Control of Renal Function, Unknown, San Rafael: Morgan & Claypool Life Sciences, doi:10.4199/c00034ed1v01y201106isp022, PMID 21850765, Wikidata Q121112788
  - Ulla C. Kopp (20 August 2011), "Chapter 2 Neuroanatomy", Neural Control of Renal Function, Unknown, San Rafael: Morgan & Claypool Life Sciences, doi:10.4199/c00034ed1v01y201106isp022, PMID 21850765, Wikidata Q121112788
  - Ulla C. Kopp (20 August 2011), "Chapter 7 Neuroanatomy", Neural Control of Renal Function, Unknown, San Rafael: Morgan & Claypool Life Sciences, doi:10.4199/c00034ed1v01y201106isp022, PMID 21850765, Wikidata Q121112788
- Ulla C. Kopp (2018). Neural Control of Renal Function. Colloquium Series on Integrated Systems Physiology From Molecule to Function. Morgan & Claypool Publishers. doi:10.4199/c00161ed2v01y201805isp080. ISBN 978-1-61504-776-5. OL 37302723M. Wikidata Q122639435.
- Timothy J. Bradley (2009). Animal Osmoregulation. Unknown. Oxford University Press. p. 121, 164. ISBN 978-0-19-856996-1. LCCN 2008027755. OCLC 179802922. OL 10141355M. Wikidata Q115690208.
- Principles and methods for the assessment of nephrotoxicity associated with exposure to chemicals (PDF). Unknown. Geneva: World Health Organization. 1991. ISBN 92-4-157119-5. OL 12898420M. Wikidata Q117037492.
- A. J. Davidson (2009). "Mouse kidney development". StemBook. doi:10.3824/stembook.1.34.1. PMID 20614633. S2CID 6364493. Wikidata Q95000300. Archived from the original on 3 March 2022.
- Jeff M. Sands; Jill W. Verlander (2004). "1 Anatomy and Physiology of the Kidneys". In Joan B. Tarloff; Lawrence H. Lash (eds.). Toxicology of the Kidney (3rd ed.). CRC Press. pp. 3–54. ISBN 0-203-67329-8. Wikidata Q117066151.

Article in scientific journals

- L. Keogh; D. Kilroy; S. Bhattacharjee (2020). "The struggle to equilibrate outer and inner milieus: Renal evolution revisited". Annals of Anatomy 151610. doi:10.1016/j.aanat.2020.151610. PMID 33065247. S2CID 223556080. Wikidata Q100682336. Archived from the original on 16 March 2022.
- Fenton, Robert; Knepper, Mark (2007). "Urea and renal function in the 21st century: insights from knockout mice". Journal of the American Society of Nephrology. 18 (3): 679–88. doi:10.1681/asn.2006101108. PMID 17251384. Wikidata Q28284934. Archived from the original on 9 March 2023.
- Abdalla, Mohamed (2020). "Anatomical features in the kidney involved in water conservation through urine concentration in dromedaries (Camelus dromedarius)" (PDF). Heliyon. 6 (1) e03139. doi:10.1016/j.heliyon.2019.e03139. PMC 6948238. PMID 31922050. S2CID 210118541. Wikidata Q92544321. Archived from the original on 26 July 2022.
- R. M. Ortiz (2001). "Osmoregulation in marine mammals". The Journal of Experimental Biology. 204 (Pt 11): 1831–1844. doi:10.1242/jeb.204.11.1831. PMID 11441026. Wikidata Q28205065. Archived from the original on 4 June 2022.
- G. Casotti; K. K. Lindberg; E. J. Braun (2000). "Functional morphology of the avian medullary cone". American Journal of Physiology - Regulatory, Integrative and Comparative Physiology. 279 (5): R1722-30. doi:10.1152/ajpregu.2000.279.5.r1722. PMID 11049855. S2CID 18147936. Wikidata Q73118986. Archived from the original on 17 March 2022.
- M. Grant Maxie, ed. (2015). Jubb, Kennedy & Palmer's Pathology of Domestic Animals. Vol. 2. Elsevier Health Sciences. pp. 378–379. ISBN 978-0-7020-5318-4. Wikidata Q115676233.
- P. S. Russell; J. Hong; J. A. Windsor; M. Itkin; A. R. J. Phillips (2019). "Renal Lymphatics: Anatomy, Physiology, and Clinical Implications" (PDF). Frontiers in Physiology. 10: 251. doi:10.3389/fphys.2019.00251. PMC 6426795. PMID 30923503. Wikidata Q64093137. Archived from the original on 16 September 2022.
- M. S. Balzer; T. Rohacs; K. Susztak (2022). "How Many Cell Types Are in the Kidney and What Do They Do?". Annual Review of Physiology. 84: 507–531. doi:10.1146/annurev-physiol-052521-121841. PMC 9233501. PMID 34843404. Wikidata Q115632371.
- Kevin Schulte; Uta Kunter; Marcus J. Moeller (2014). "The evolution of blood pressure and the rise of mankind". Nephrology Dialysis Transplantation. 30 (5): 713–723. doi:10.1093/ndt/gfu275. PMID 25140012. S2CID 10343616. Wikidata Q38241521. Archived from the original on 25 February 2022.
- Sands, Jeff; H. E. Layton (2009). "The physiology of urinary concentration: an update". Seminars in Nephrology. 29 (3): 178–195. doi:10.1016/j.semnephrol.2009.03.008. PMC 2709207. PMID 19523568. Wikidata Q37258135.
- Dominique Eladari; Y. Kumai (2014). "Renal acid-base regulation: new insights from animal models". Pflügers Archiv: European Journal of Physiology. 467 (8): 1623–1641. doi:10.1007/s00424-014-1669-x. PMID 25515081. Wikidata Q38290770.
- Alan J. Davidson (2011). "Uncharted waters: nephrogenesis and renal regeneration in fish and mammals" (PDF). Pediatric Nephrology. 26 (9): 1435–1443. doi:10.1007/s00467-011-1795-z. PMID 21336813. Wikidata Q37845213.
- Sanjeev Kumar (2018). "Cellular and molecular pathways of renal repair after acute kidney injury". Kidney International. 93 (1): 27–40. doi:10.1016/j.kint.2017.07.030. PMID 29291820. Wikidata Q50424175.
- António Nogueira; Maria João Pires; Paula Alexandra Oliveira (2017). "Pathophysiological Mechanisms of Renal Fibrosis: A Review of Animal Models and Therapeutic Strategies". In Vivo. 31 (1): 1–22. doi:10.21873/invivo.11019. PMC 5354133. PMID 28064215. Wikidata Q37705263.
- Vize, Peter; Homer W. Smith (2004). "A Homeric view of kidney evolution: A reprint of H.W. Smith's classic essay with a new introduction. Evolution of the kidney. 1943". The Anatomical Record Part A: Discoveries in Molecular, Cellular, and Evolutionary Biology. 277 (2): 344–354. doi:10.1002/ar.a.20017. PMID 15052662. Wikidata Q48664600.
- Xu Zhou; Wenqi Rong; Boxiong Guo; et al. (2023). "The Evolution of the Discrete Multirenculate Kidney in Mammals from Ecological and Molecular Perspectives". Genome Biology and Evolution. 15 (5). doi:10.1093/gbe/evad075. Wikidata Q122181216.
- Hai-Chun Yang; Shao-Jun Liu; Agnes B. Fogo (2014). "Kidney regeneration in mammals". Nephron Experimental Nephrology. 126 (2): 50. doi:10.1159/000360661. PMC 4337834. PMID 24854640. Wikidata Q55210136.
- Little, Melissa; McMahon, Andrew (2012). "Mammalian kidney development: principles, progress, and projections". Cold Spring Harbor Perspectives in Biology. 4 (5). doi:10.1101/cshperspect.a008300. PMC 3331696. PMID 22550230. Wikidata Q35902711. Archived from the original on 21 January 2022.
