= Salivary gland hyperplasia =

Medical condition

Salivary gland hyperplasia is hyperplasia of the terminal duct of salivary glands.

There are two types:

- Acinar adenomatoid hyperplasia
- Ductal adenomatoid hyperplasia
