= Cellular adaptation =

Changes made by a cell in response to environmental changes

In cell biology and pathophysiology, cellular adaptation refers to changes made by a cell in response to adverse or varying environmental changes. The adaptation may be physiologic (normal) or pathologic (abnormal).

Morphological adaptations observed at the cellular level include atrophy, hypertrophy, hyperplasia, and metaplasia. In the medical context, outside of specialized branches of biomedicine, morphological adaptations are not always referenced to the fundamental cellular level, but are observed and assessed at the level of tissues and organs. Dysplasia is a process of cell change associated with cellular abnormality, which is not considered adaptive in the positive sense of adaptation.

== Atrophy ==
Cellular atrophy is a decrease in cell size. If enough cells in an organ undergo atrophy the entire organ will decrease in size. Thymus atrophy during early human development (childhood) is an example of physiologic atrophy. Skeletal muscle atrophy is a common pathologic adaptation to skeletal muscle disuse (commonly called "disuse atrophy"). Tissue and organs especially susceptible to atrophy include skeletal muscle, cardiac muscle, secondary sex organs, and the brain.

== Hypertrophy ==
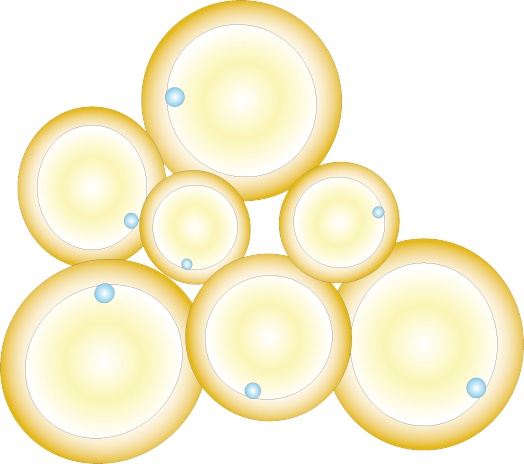
Illustration of adipocytes of different sizes. In response to dietary excess energy intake, adipocytes adapt by increased storage of lipids, resulting in cellular hypertrophy.

Cellular hypertrophy is an increase in cell size and volume. If enough cells of an organ hypertrophy the whole organ will increase in size. Hypertrophy may involve an increase in intracellular protein as well as cytosol (intracellular fluid) and other cytoplasmic components. For example, adipocytes (fat cells) may expand in size by depositing more lipid within cytoplasmic vesicles. Thus in human adults, increases in body fat tissue occurs mostly by increases in the size of adipocytes, not by increases in the number of adipocytes. Hypertrophy may be caused by mechanical signals (e.g., stretch) or trophic signals (e.g., growth factors). An example of physiologic hypertrophy is in skeletal muscle with sustained weight bearing exercise. An example of pathologic hypertrophy is in cardiac muscle as a result of hypertension.

== Hyperplasia ==
Hyperplasia is an increase in the number of cells. It is the result of increased cell mitosis or division (also referred to as cell proliferation). The two types of physiologic hyperplasia are compensatory and hormonal. Compensatory hyperplasia permits tissue and organ regeneration. It is common in epithelial cells of the epidermis and intestine, liver hepatocytes, bone marrow cells, and fibroblasts. It occurs to a lesser extent in bone, cartilage, and smooth muscle cells. Hormonal hyperplasia occurs mainly in organs that depend on estrogen. For example, the estrogen-dependent uterine cells undergo hyperplasia and hypertrophy following pregnancy. Pathologic hyperplasia is an abnormal increase in cell division. A common pathologic hyperplasia in women occurs in the endometrium and is called endometriosis.

== Metaplasia ==
Metaplasia occurs when a cell of a certain type is replaced by another cell type, which may be less differentiated. It is a reversible process thought to be caused by stem cell reprogramming. Stem cells are found in epithelia and embryonic mesenchyme of connective tissue. A prominent example of metaplasia involves the changes associated with the respiratory tract in response to inhalation of irritants, such as smog or smoke. The bronchial cells convert from mucus-secreting, ciliated, columnar epithelium to non-ciliated, squamous epithelium incapable of secreting mucus. These transformed cells may become dysplastic or cancerous if the stimulus (e.g., cigarette smoking) is not removed. The most common example of metaplasia is Barrett's esophagus, when the non-keratinizing squamous epithelium of the esophagus undergoes metaplasia to become mucinous columnar cells, ultimately protecting the esophagus from acid reflux originating in the stomach. If stress persists, metaplasia can progress to dysplasia and eventually carcinoma; Barrett's esophagus, for example, can eventually progress to adenocarcinoma.

== Dysplasia ==
Dysplasia refers to abnormal changes in cellular shape, size, and/or organization. Dysplasia is not considered a true adaptation; rather, it is thought to be related to hyperplasia and is sometimes called "atypical hyperplasia". Tissues prone to dysplasia include cervical and respiratory epithelium, where it is strongly associated with the development of cancer; it may also be involved in the development of breast cancer. Although dysplasia is reversible, if stress persists, then dysplasia progresses to irreversible carcinoma.

== See also ==
- Cell damage
