= Reniculate kidney =

Organ found in aquatic mammals

The reniculate kidney is a multilobed kidney found in marine and aquatic mammals such as pinnipeds (seals, sea lions and walruses) and cetaceans (dolphins and whales) but absent in terrestrial mammals except bears. Kidneys of this morphology have increased surface area for removing toxins from the body more efficiently than a non-lobed kidney.

The reniculate structure in cetaceans and pinnipeds does not result in a greater concentrating ability. While many marine mammals can concentrate their urine beyond the concentration of sea water, only sirenians and otters can reach levels of Na^{+} and Cl^{−} concentrations similar to sea water, making it possible for them to consume salt water without losing fresh water. However, pinnipeds and cetaceans typically regulate their water balance by metabolism and only drink sea water occasionally to maintain salt balance. In contrast, sea otters often drink sea water, and manatees frequently drink fresh water .
