= Compensatory growth (organ) =

Type of regenerative growth

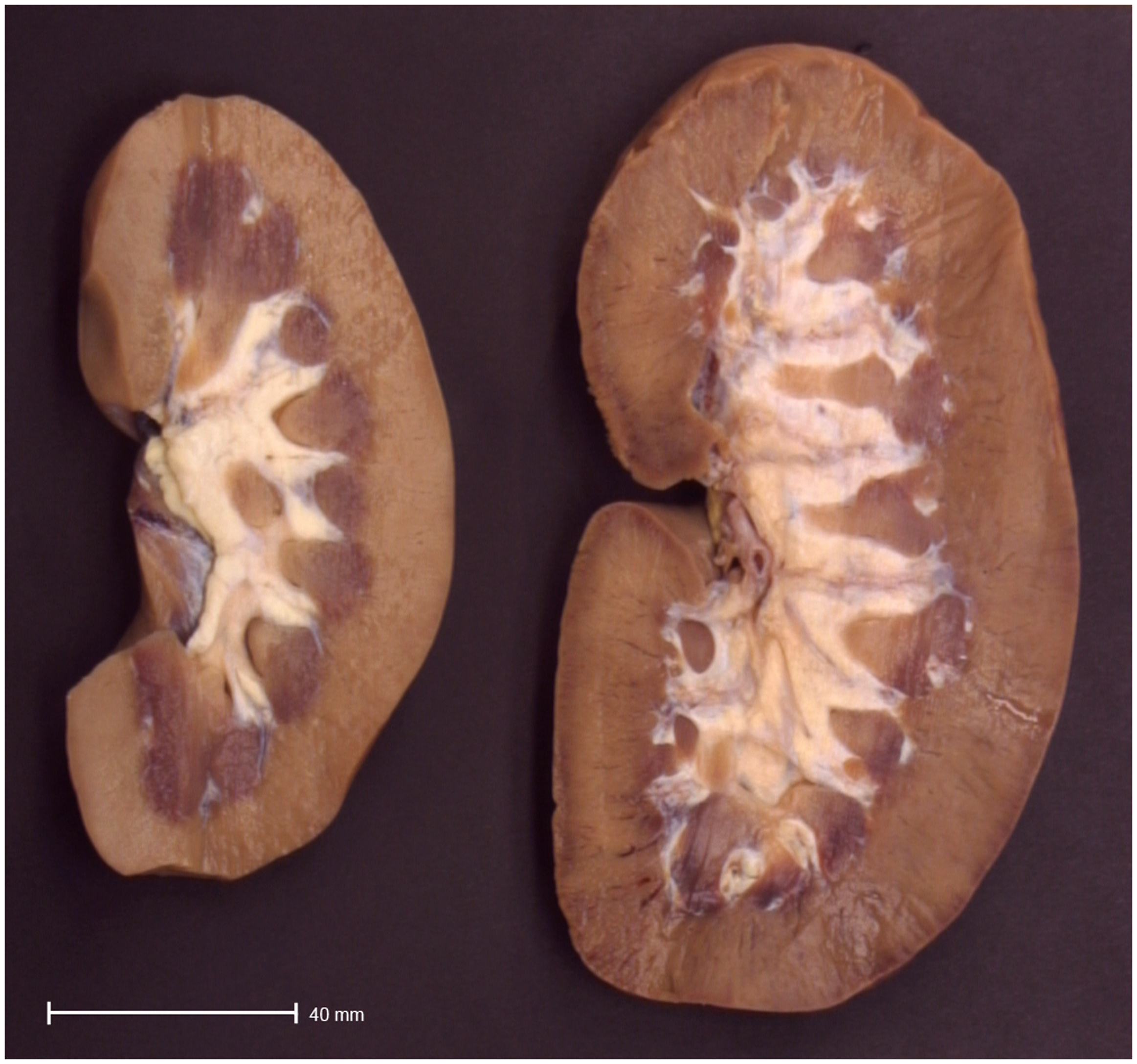
Size of a normal pig kidney (left) compared to a solitary pig kidney (right).

Compensatory growth is a type of regenerative growth that can take place in a number of human organs after the organs are either damaged, removed, or cease to function. Additionally, increased functional demand can also stimulate this growth in tissues and organs. The growth can be a result of increased cell size (compensatory hypertrophy) or an increase in cell division (compensatory hyperplasia) or both. For instance, if one kidney is surgically removed, the cells of the other kidney divide at an increased rate. Eventually, the remaining kidney can grow until its mass approaches the combined mass of two kidneys. Along with the kidneys, compensatory growth has also been characterized in a number of other tissues and organs including:

- The adrenal glands
- The heart
- Muscles
- The liver
- The lungs
- The pancreas (beta cells and acinar cells)
- The mammary glands
- The spleen (where bone marrow and lymphatic tissue undergo compensatory hypertrophy and assumes the spleen function during spleen injury)
- The testicles
- The thyroid gland
- The turbinates of the nose

A large number of growth factors and hormones are involved with compensatory growth, but the exact mechanism is not fully understood and probably varies between different organs. Nevertheless, angiogenic growth factors which control the growth of blood vessels are particularly important because blood flow significantly determines the maximum growth of an organ.

Compensatory growth may also refer to the accelerated growth following a period of slowed growth, particularly as a result of nutrient deprivation.

== See also ==
- Hyperplasia
- Hypertrophy
- Cellular adaptation
