= Small mammal =

Mammal category

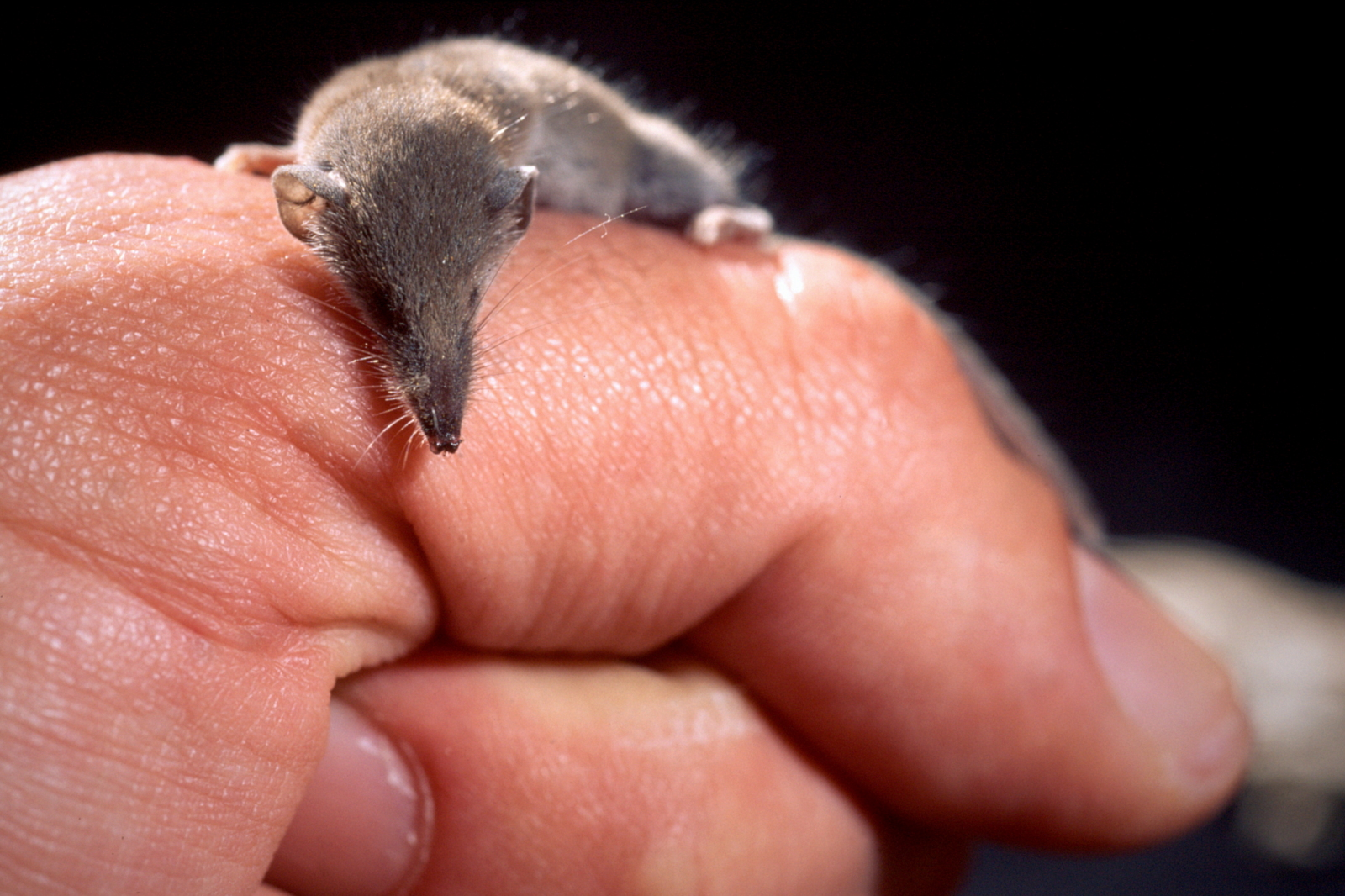
The Etruscan shrew, an especially small mammal

Small mammals or micromammals are a subdivision of mammals based on their body mass and size. Different values have been used as the upper limit. The International Biological Programme has defined small mammals as species weighing up to 5 kg. Alternatively, the International Union for Conservation of Nature (IUCN) groups the orders of rodents, tree shrews and eulipotyphlans (insectivores) together under the term small mammals.

A significant majority of mammal species falls into the category of small mammals. They are found in a great range of habitats and climate zones.

== Characteristics ==
Many small mammals have a short livespan and high fertility rate, resulting in a comparatively high variability in genetic composition. Their size leads to a reduced energy need for movement, but a high energy requirement for maintaining body temperature. This results in a high rate of food intake, using a wide range food sources. Their small size, together with frequently nocturnal or crepuscular activity, provide some protection against predators.

== List of species ==
=== Tree shrews ===
The tree shrews (family Tupaiidae) are non-rodent, primate-like animals and are classified into the order Scandentia. They are subdivided into two subfamilies: the diurnal subfamily Tupaiinae with five genera (Tupaia, Anathana, Dendrogale, Lyonogale, Urogale) and the nocturnal subfamily Ptilocercinae with a single genus, pen-tailed tree shrew Ptilocercus

== Research and conservation ==
The SSC Small Mammal Specialist Group (SMSG) of the IUCN "serves as the global authority on the world's small mammals" both with regard to research as well as conservation efforts.
