= Hyperplasia of midface =

- Other names: Big midface Hypertrophy of midface Large midface Midface hyperplasia Midfacial excess Midfacial prominence Overgrowth of the midface
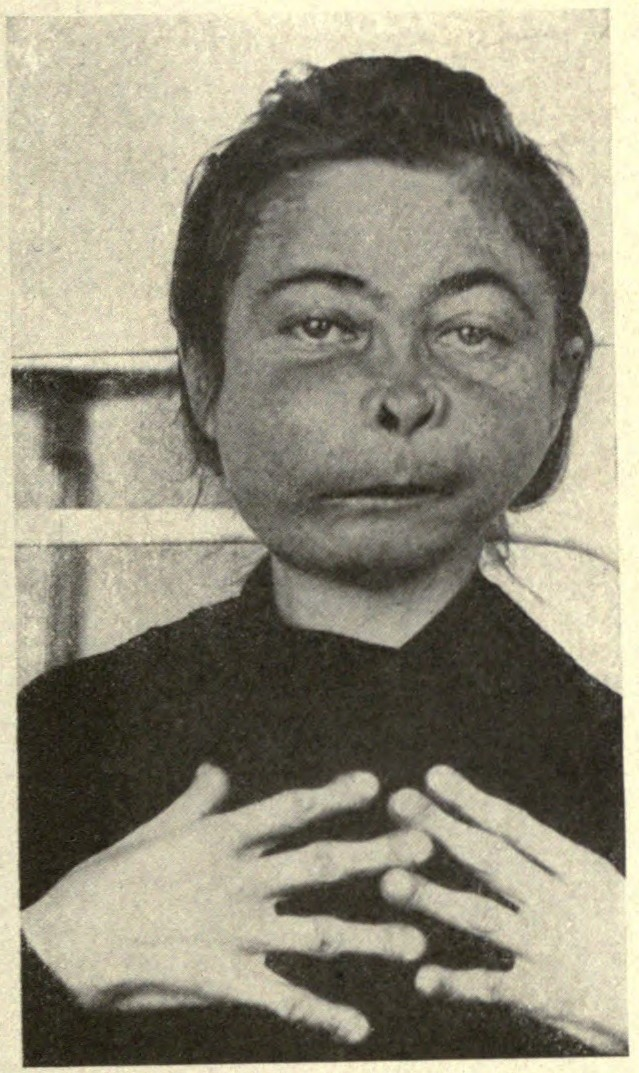
- Hyperplasia of midface with bulbous fingers in leontiasis ossea

Hyperplasia of midface is a condition in which the infraorbital and perialar regions are anteriorally positioned, facial convexity is increased, and/or the nasolabial angle is increased.

== Syndromes (conditions) ==
Hyperplasia of midface is seen in the following conditions and syndromes:

- Craniofacial dysplasia - osteopenia syndrome
- Polyhydramnios, megalencephaly, and symptomatic epilepsy
- Seckel syndrome (NSMCE2)
- Troyer syndrome

== See also ==
- Facial bones
