= Hyperplasia =

Enlargement of tissue due to cell proliferation

- Whereas hypertrophy stems from an increase in cell size, hyperplasia results from an increase in cell number.
- Specialty: Pathology
- Types: Benign prostatic hyperplasia, Hyperplasia of the breast(many more)
- Diagnostic method: Biopsy
- Treatment: Depends which type (see types)

Hyperplasia (from Ancient Greek ὑπέρ (hupér) 'over' and πλάσις (plásis) 'formation'), or hypergenesis, is an enlargement of an organ or tissue caused by an increase in the amount of tissue that results from cell proliferation. It may lead to the gross enlargement of an organ, and the term is sometimes confused with benign neoplasia or benign tumor.

Hyperplasia is a common preneoplastic response to stimulus. Microscopically, cells resemble normal cells but are increased in numbers. Sometimes cells may also be increased in size (hypertrophy). Hyperplasia is different from hypertrophy in that the adaptive cell change in hypertrophy is an increase in the size of cells, whereas hyperplasia involves an increase in the number of cells.

== Causes ==
Hyperplasia may be due to any number of causes, including proliferation of basal layer of epidermis to compensate skin loss, chronic inflammatory response, hormonal dysfunctions, or compensation for damage or disease elsewhere. Hyperplasia may be harmless and occur on a particular tissue. An example of a normal hyperplastic response would be the growth and multiplication of milk-secreting glandular cells in the breast as a response to pregnancy, thus preparing for future breast feeding.

One of the most potent and noteworthy effects insulin-like growth factor 1 (IGF-1) has on the human body is its ability to cause hyperplasia, which is an actual splitting of cells. By contrast, hypertrophy is what occurs, for example, to skeletal muscle cells during weight resistance training and is simply an increase in the size of the cells. With IGF-1 use, one is able to cause hyperplasia which actually increases the number of muscle cells present in the tissue. Weight training enables these new cells to mature in size and strength. It is theorized that hyperplasia may also be induced through specific power output training for athletic performance, thus increasing the number of muscle fibers instead of increasing the size of a single fiber.

== Mechanism ==
Hyperplasia is considered to be a physiological (normal) response to a specific stimulus, and the cells of a hyperplastic growth remain subject to normal regulatory control mechanisms. However, hyperplasia can also occur as a pathological response, if an excess of hormone or growth factor is responsible for the stimuli. Similarly to physiological hyperplasia, cells that undergo pathologic hyperplasia are controlled by growth hormones, and cease to proliferate if such stimuli are removed. This differs from neoplasia (the process underlying cancer and benign tumors), in which genetically abnormal cells manage to proliferate in a non-physiological manner which is unresponsive to normal stimuli. That being said, the effects caused by pathologic hyperplasia can provide a suitable foundation from which neoplastic cells may develop.

== Role in disease ==
Hyperplasia of certain tissues may cause disease. Pathologic hyperplasia in these tissues may occur due to infection, physiological stress or trauma, or abnormal levels of particular hormones, such as estrogen, ACTH, or cortisol.

=== Types ===
Some of the more commonly known clinical forms of hyperplasia, or conditions leading to hyperplasia, include:

- Benign prostatic hyperplasia, also known as prostate enlargement.
- Cushing's disease – Physiopathology of hyperplasia of adrenal cortex due to increased circulating level of ACTH (adrenocorticotropic hormone).
- Congenital adrenal hyperplasia – Inherited disorder of gland (adrenal).
- Endometrial hyperplasia – Hyperproliferation of the endometrium, usually in response to unopposed estrogen stimulation in the setting of polyendocrine metabolic ovarian syndrome (PMOS) or exogenous administration of hormones. Atypical endometrial hyperplasia may represent an early neoplastic process which can lead to endometrial adenocarcinoma. The development of endometrial adenocarcinoma from endometrial hyperplasia is a typical example of how the effects of pathologic hyperplasia can lead to neoplasia, and females who exhibit hyperplasia of the endometrium are indeed more likely to develop cancer of these cells.

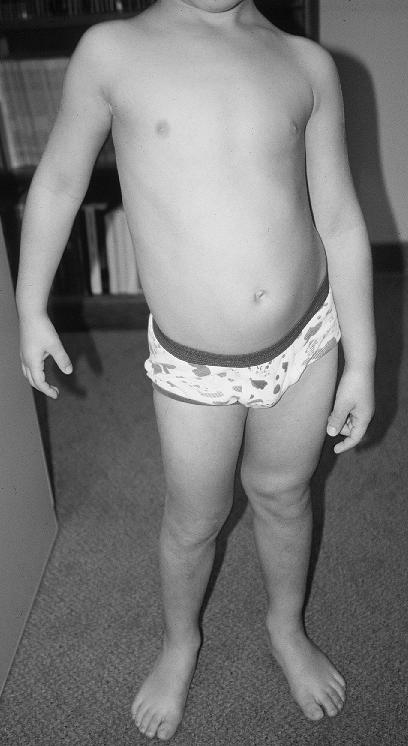
Patient with hemihyperplasia involving the upper and lower left extremities. The leg length discrepancy can be noted by the pelvic tilt.

- Hemihyperplasia – When only half (or one side) of the body is affected, sometimes generating limbs of different lengths.
- Hyperplasia of the breast – "Hyperplastic" lesions of the breast include usual ductal hyperplasia, a focal expansion of the number of cells in a terminal breast duct, and atypical ductal hyperplasia, in which a more abnormal pattern of growth is seen, and which is associated with an increased risk of developing breast cancer.
- Intimal hyperplasia – The thickening of the tunica intima of a blood vessel as a complication of a reconstruction procedure or endarterectomy. Intimal hyperplasia is the universal response of a vessel to injury and is an important reason of late bypass graft failure, particularly in vein and synthetic vascular grafts.
- Focal epithelial hyperplasia (also known as Heck's disease) – This is a wart-like growth in the mucous tissues of the mouth or, rarely, throat that is caused by certain sub-types of the human papillomavirus (HPV). Heck's disease has not been known to cause cancer.
- Myofibre hyperplasia (also known as double-muscling) – seen in cattle, genetic mutations cause large muscles due to increased proliferation of myofibres and decreased adipose tissue.
- Sebaceous hyperplasia – In this condition, small yellowish growths develop on the skin, usually on the face. This condition is neither contagious nor dangerous.
- Compensatory liver hyperplasia – The liver undergoes cellular division after acute injury, resulting in new cells that restore liver function back to baseline. Approximately 75% of the liver can be acutely damaged or resected with seemingly full regeneration through hepatocyte division, i.e., hyperplasia. This is what makes living-donor liver transplants possible.
- Epidermal hyperplasia of the skin

== See also ==
- List of biological development disorders
- Hyperplasia of midface
