= Toxic injury =

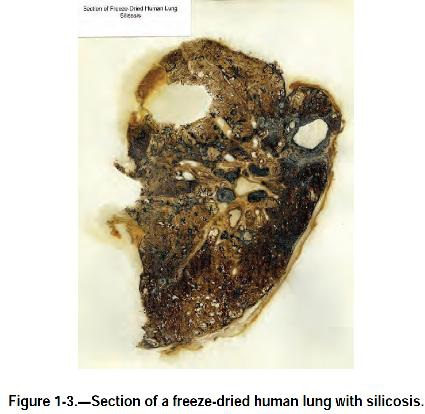
- Section of a lung with silicosis, an occupational toxic injury resulting from exposure to silica dust
- Treatment: Removal from exposure source, antitoxin therapy, chelation therapy, or antidote where applicable, treatment of symptoms and resulting illness
- Prognosis: Varies

A toxic injury is a type of injury resulting from exposure to a toxin. Toxic injuries can manifest as teratogenic effects, respiratory effects, gastrointestinal effects, cardiovascular effects, hepatic effects, renal effects, neurological effects, or a combination thereof. They can also produce delayed effects, including various forms of cancer and learning disability. Effects can occur after acute (short-term) or chronic (long-term) exposure, depending on the toxicity, dose, and method of exposure.

== Signs and symptoms ==
Every toxic injury or exposure to a toxin has different effects and symptoms. Some toxic effects do not necessarily cause permanent damage and can be reversible. However, some toxins can cause irreversible permanent damage. Depending on the intensity of the poison of the substance it can affect just one particular organ system or they may produce generalized toxicity by affecting a number of systems. A variety of symptoms occur depending on how and where the toxic injuries affect the body. Generally, if the toxins affect the respiratory system the symptoms are coughing, tight chest, difficulty in breathing and nose and throat irritation. Miscarriage or infertility can occur if it occurs in the ovaries or testes. Depression, severe headaches and dizziness are the symptoms for toxins affecting the spinal cord and brain. Visible reactions such as skin rashes, and swelling and eye redness are common. Exposure to asbestos can lead to Mesothelioma which is a cancer that can cause serious damage to the lining of the lungs. The symptoms include shortness of breath, cough, night sweats and fever.

== Causes ==
There are thousands of causes of toxic injuries. A toxic injury is caused when one comes in contact with any toxin. However, some causes are still unknown or extremely uncommon. Generally, there are two different categories in which a toxic injury may fall into. An injury due to an environmental toxin, or an injury due to chemical exposure. An environmental toxin is one that is found naturally in our surroundings. (For example, molds. Mold spores may be found both indoors and outdoors.) Although it is possible that an environmental toxin can be produced with human intervention (such as pesticides) it is still considered natural. Injuries due to chemical exposure are often more severe due to the nature of these highly toxic substances. Common toxins that may cause a chemical toxic injury are found in consumer products, pharmaceuticals and industrial products.

=== Environmental toxic injuries ===
Many commonly found natural substances may be toxic. They can be found in our air, water or food supply. The top ten most common environmental toxins are:

- PCBs
- Pesticides
- Molds
- Phthalates
- VOCs
- Dioxins
- Asbestos
- Heavy metals
- Chloroform
- Chlorine

== Prevention ==
Avoiding direct exposure to toxins will reduce the risk of toxic injury.

For safety reasons, wear personal protective equipment when working near environmental or chemical toxins. Many countries have guides classifying dangerous goods and identifying the risks associated with them, such as Canada's Workplace Hazardous Materials Information System. These guides have been developed to ensure worker safety when handling dangerous chemical toxins. It is also important to maintain a clean and dry environment to prevent toxic molds in the home and workplace.

In the event that a toxic injury occurs, victims may have the option to file a specific type of lawsuit called a toxic tort.
