= Precapillary resistance =

Modulation of blood flow by capillaries

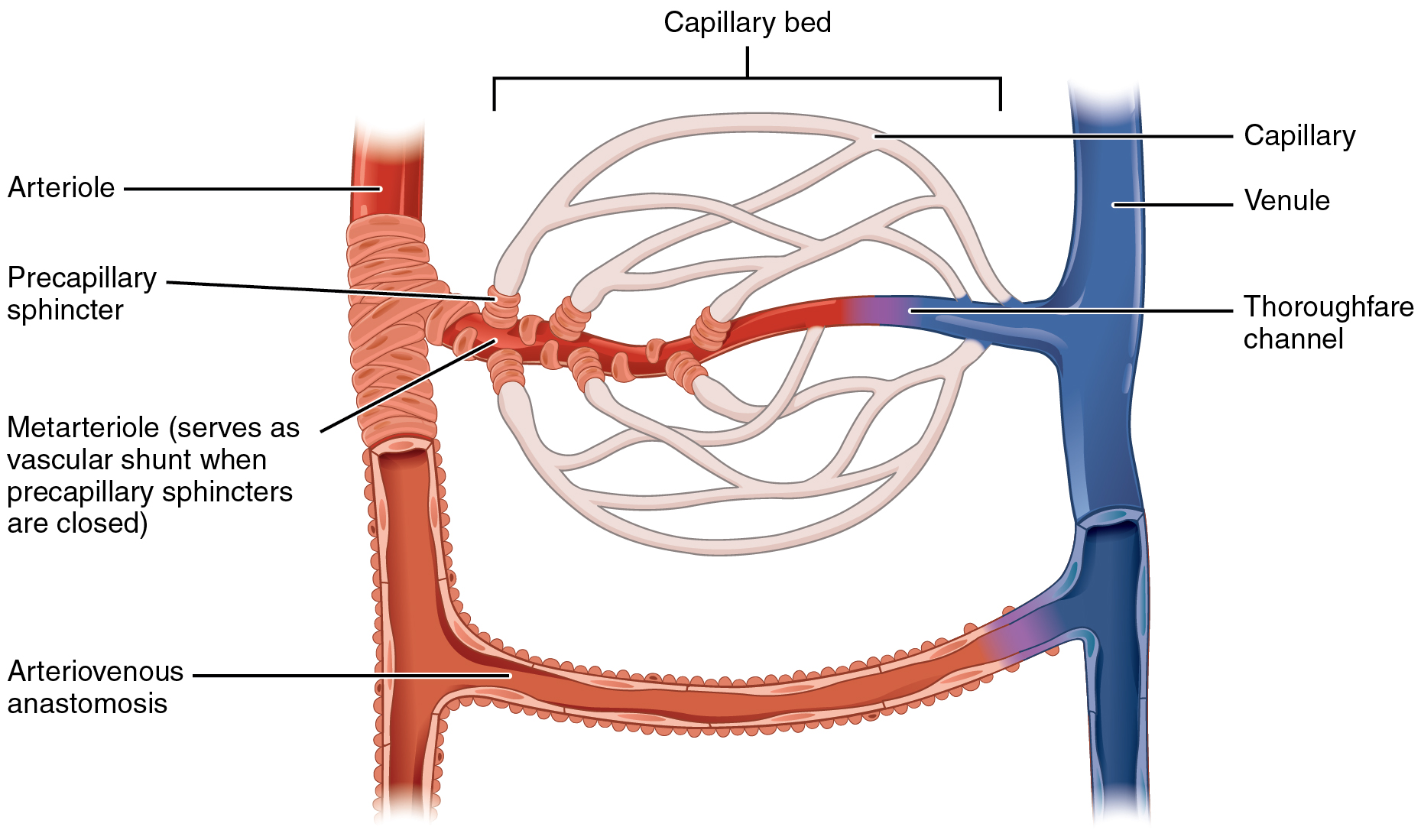
- Illustration of a capillary system with precapillary sphincters, which are the regulators of precapillary resistance in the mesenteric circulation.

Precapillary resistance is the modulation of blood flow by capillaries through vasomotion, either opening (dilating) and letting blood pass through, or by constricting their lumens, reducing bloodflow through the capillary bed (occluding the passage of blood). It is not entirely clear how precapillary resistance is created in many parts of the body. Precapillary sphincters are smooth muscle structures that mediate the precapillary resistance in the mesenteric microcirculation.

== See also ==
- Capillary
- Metarteriole
- Precapillary sphincter
