= Surface chemistry of microvasculature =

Microvasculature comprises the microvessels – venules and capillaries of the microcirculation, with a maximum average diameter of 0.3 millimeters. As the vessels decrease in size, they increase their surface-area-to-volume ratio. This allows surface properties to play a significant role in the function of the vessel.

Diffusion occurs through the walls of the vessels due to a concentration gradient, allowing the necessary exchange of ions, molecules, or blood cells. The permeability of a capillary wall is determined by the type of capillary and the surface of the endothelial cells. A continuous, tightly spaced endothelial cell lining only permits the diffusion of small molecules. Larger molecules and blood cells require adequate space between cells or holes in the lining. The high resistivity of a cellular membrane prevents the diffusion of ions without a membrane transport protein. The hydrophobicity of an endothelial cell surface determines whether water or lipophilic molecules will diffuse through the capillary lining. The blood brain barrier restricts diffusion to small hydrophobic molecules, making drug diffusion difficult to achieve.

Blood flow is directly influenced by the thermodynamics of the body. Changes in temperature affect the viscosity and surface tension of the blood, altering the minimum blood flow rate. At high temperatures the minimum flow rate will decrease and the capillary will expand. This allows heat transfer through the increased surface area of the inner capillary lining and through increased blood flow. At low temperatures the minimum flow rate will increase and the capillary will constrict. This restricts blood flow and decreases the surface area of the capillary, reducing heat transfer.

Fluid mechanics are primarily affected by pressure, temperature, heat transfer, and electrokinetics. An increase in pressure increases the flow rate given by the Starling equation. An increase in temperature increases the wettability of the surface, promoting fluid flow. Heat also decreases the viscosity of the lumen. Heat transfer is monitored by thermoreceptors which regulate the amount of capillary beds open for heat dissipation. The surface chemistry of the endothelial cell lining also dictates fluid flow. A charged surface will acquire a layer of stagnant diffuse ions that hinder the flow of ions in the lumen. This decreases the lumen velocity and promotes the exchange of molecules through the capillary lining.

== Diffusion ==
Diffusion is the movement of molecules due to a concentration gradient. The molecules move in a random walk pattern in order to achieve a uniform solution.

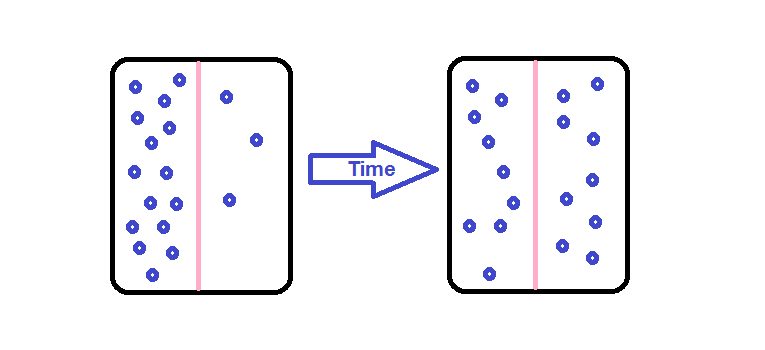
Simple diffusion of a substance (blue) due to a concentration gradient across a semi-permeable membrane (pink).

=== Surface diffusion of endothelial cells ===
Capillary walls contain a monolayer of endothelial cells. There are two ways for molecules to diffuse through the endothelial monolayer: through gaps between the cells or directly through the cells. Molecules diffuse through the capillary walls due to concentration gradients. Diffusion between the cells changes depending upon the type of capillary. There are three different types of capillaries: continuous, fenestrated, and sinusoidal also called discontinuous. In continuous capillaries the endothelial cells are tightly spaced, allowing only small molecules like ions or water to diffuse through the intercellular clefts (the gaps between the endothelial cells). In fenestrated and sinusoidal capillaries there is more space between the cells, allowing the diffusion of macro-molecules and some proteins. Sinusoidal capillaries have large holes that permit the passage of red and white blood cells. The diffusion of gases and lipid-soluble molecules can occur directly through the endothelial cells, described by Fick's first law:

$$J = - D \frac{\partial C}{\partial x}$$

where

- J is the flux
- D is the diffusivity
- C is the concentration
- x is the thickness of the barrier

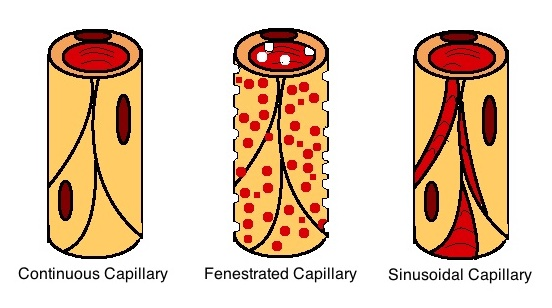
Different types of capillaries allow the diffusion of different molecules.

The surface charge of endothelial cells at points of diffusivity can determine which type of molecule can diffuse through the capillary walls. If the surface is hydrophilic, it will allow water and charged molecules to pass through. If it is hydrophobic, non-charged and lipophilic molecules will be able to diffuse through. These intermolecular screening forces are also known as van der Waals forces, which is determined by the Keesom, Debye and London dispersion forces. The lipid bilayer of an endothelial cell membrane is a hydrophobic surface. The non-polar lipids lead to a very high electrical resistivity, given by

$$R_\text{e} = \frac{R_\text{mem}}{A}$$

where

- R_{e} is the resistivity of the membrane
- R_{mem} is the specific membrane resistance
- A is the area

This high resistivity prevents ions from crossing the bilayer without an integral membrane protein using facilitated diffusion.

=== Drug delivery diffusion ===
Drugs diffuse through capillary walls in the same manner as endogenous molecules. One of the most important examples of this is drug diffusion across the blood brain barrier. The blood brain barrier consists of a bed of continuous capillaries. Typically only small hydrophobic molecules are able to diffuse across the blood brain barrier. This makes it very difficult to get drugs into the brain without invasively administering them directly into the brain. One possible solution is the utilization of nanoparticles. Nanoparticles are synthesized to encapsulate a target drug. The surface of the nanoparticle, if not already hydrophobic, may have polymers attached to the surface to adjust the current polarity. Ligands can also be attached to the surface of a nanoparticle to target certain receptors located within the brain. Once the nanoparticle is through the blood brain barrier it releases the drug into the brain. A specific example of this solution is the delivery of anti-HIV drugs to the central nervous system by TAT-conjugated nanoparticles.

== Thermodynamics ==
The ambient temperature of the body directly affects blood flow through microvasculature. Changes in temperature affect the viscosity of blood and the surface tension. Surface tension decreases with increasing temperature, decreasing the minimum flow rate (see Surface tension). The decrease in minimum flow rate by higher temperatures allows more blood to flow and dissipate heat throughout the body. Temperature greatly affects blood flow by influencing the diameter of flow. Decreases and increases in temperature trigger vasoconstriction and vasodilation respectively.

=== Vasoconstriction ===
Vasoconstriction affects flow rate and surface properties of the microvasculature by constricting the smooth muscle cells and decreasing the diameter of flow. The smooth muscle cells are able to constrict from both external and internal stimuli. This mechanism can be triggered by the ambient temperature or the autonomic nervous system. When cold, the body attempts to capture heat in the blood by constricting the smooth muscle cells around the microvasculature. The muscle cells are constricted by an increase in calcium. The decreased cross-sectional area for flow increases the vascular resistance and lowers the flow to extremities. This mechanism allows the body to concentrate the heat around the vital organs for survival.

The formula for calculating the systemic vascular resistance is

$$SVR = 80 \times \frac{MAP - MRAP}{CO}$$

where

- SVR as the systemic vascular resistance,
- MAP as the mean arterial pressure,
- MRAP as the mean right atrial pressure,
- CO as the cardiac output in milliliters per minute.

Typical values are in the range 100–300 dynes×sec×cm-5.

=== Vasodilation ===
Vasodilation is, in essence, the opposite of vasoconstriction. In vasodilation the blood vessels dilate to allow more blood flow. The smooth muscle cells are relaxed to increase the diameter of flow, decreasing the vascular resistance. This is possible due to the direct relationship between the cardiac output, mean arterial pressure and the vascular resistance. Like vasoconstriction, vasodilation can be caused by internal and external factors. For example, nitric oxide, found in food, is a very potent vasodilator. It has been found that nerves in the spinal column can trigger both processes. Vasodilation is also triggered for thermoregulation to provide heat dissipation.

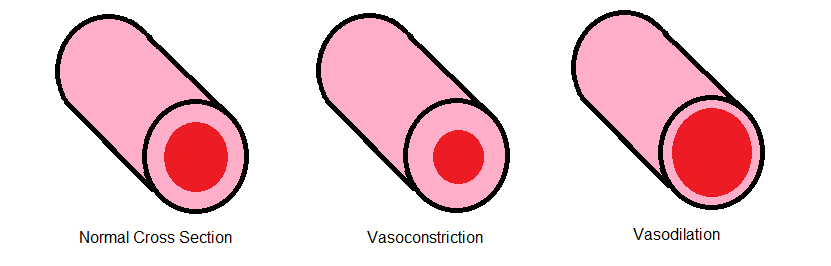
Vasoconstriction and vasodilation shown next to a normal capillarity cross section for comparison.

== Fluid mechanics ==
=== Starling equation ===
The Starling equation describes the flow of a solvent through a capillary bed. The equation can be seen below

$$J_v = K_f\left[ (P_c - P_i)- \sigma(\pi_c - \pi_i)\right]$$

A description of the constants, as well as some of the average values can be seen in the following table.

Variable	Definition	Calculation	Approximate Normal Value
P_{c}	Capillary hydrostatic pressure	P_{c} = 0.2 × Arterial Pressure + Venous Pressure; 1.2	25mmHg (arteriolar end); 10mmHg (venous end)
P_{i}	Tissue interstitial pressure	Determined by the compliance of tissue Compliance = volume/Δ pressure Varies by location	≅ −6 mmHg
Π_{c}	Capillary oncotic pressure	Measured across semipermeabel membrane Varies by location and fenestration of microvasculature	23–30 mmHg
Π_{i}	Tissue oncotic pressure	Higher permeability α Higher Π_{i} Higher capillary filtration α Lower Π_{i}	≈ 5 mmHg
K_{f}	Filtration coefficient	K_{f} = area × hydraulic conductivity
σ	Reflection coefficient	Correction factor for protein leakage across membrane

The filtration coefficient is determined by the hydraulic conductivity, which is a measure of how easy it is for water to move through a tortuous area. In microvasculature, this is controlled by the porosity of a capillary and whether it is continuous, fenestrated or sinusoidal. The reflection coefficient acts as a correction factor and is determined by the difference in particle size and pore ratio. It is thought of as the probability that the particle will travel into a pore within the capillary walls before traveling into the interstitial fluid. If the particle is an ion, there will be an effect experienced from the charge of endothelial linings that may increase or decrease the reflection coefficient.

==== Temperature effects ====
In fluids with relatively low viscosity there is an almost linear, inverse relationship between temperature and surface tension. The decrease in surface tension increases the wettability of the capillary walls, making it easier for the fluid to flow through the capillary.

Heat also effects the viscosity of a fluid inside a capillary. An increase in heat decreases the viscosity of the lumenal fluid. A good example of this action can be observed in the human body during exercise. When a human is exercising, there is an increase in the metabolic rate inside the muscles, creating an increase in heat production. The increase in heat is detected by thermoreceptors, a type of sensory receptor located at various points in body. These receptors send a signal to the brain that tells the body to dilate the blood vessels, including capillaries. This creates a visible change in the number of vessels on the skin. This allows for heat transfer via convection to occur.

==== Heat transfer by circulation ====
Blood vessels transfer heat by convection. Convection is dominated by Brownian motion and advection. With convection, the heat in the system moves from a point of high heat concentration to low heat concentration, a concept similar to diffusion. The amount of the heat flow is dependent upon the difference in ambient temperature and internal temperature, which is detected by thermoreceptors. If the ambient temperature is higher than the temperature in the capillaries, the body will open precapillary sphincter to increase the number of capillary beds. This increases the overall capillary surface area, allowing for increased heat transfer through convection.

==== Electrokinetic phenomena ====
Surface charges on vessel walls affect the flow of ions through the capillaries and fluid mechanics in microvasculature. A charged endothelial lining creates a bound layer of ions where diffusion occurs between the cell walls and lumen, also known as the stern layer. This creates a diffuse layer, a charge gradient where ions move towards the charged surface, in the endothelial lining of capillaries. The effects of the charged endothelial cells decay exponentially over a measured distance, which is known as the Debye length. Ions in the diffuse layer impinge movement of other ions in the lumen, slowing down the surrounding solution to allow more diffusion to occur. The velocity profile can be determined by the Helmholtz–Smoluchowski equation:

$$\vec{v}= -\frac{\varepsilon_o \varepsilon_r \zeta \vec{E}} \mu$$

- where $\vec{v}$ is the velocity
- ε_{o} is the permittivity of free space
- ε_{r} is the dielectric constant,
- ζ is the zeta potential
- μ is the viscosity of the fluid
- and $\vec{E}$ is the electric field created from the charged surface lining of the endothelial cells.

The electric field created by the charged endothelial cells can be conceptually modeled by a hollow cylinder. The charged surface applies a resulting electric field that acts on a particle within the center of a cylinder in a direction perpendicular to the cross section of the observed cylinder.

When there is an increased salt concentration in the lumen of the capillary, the debye length decreases. This decreases the magnitude of the velocity described by the Helmholtz–Smoluchowski equation.
