= Bemer therapy =

Alternative medical treatment method

Bemer therapy, also referred to as Physical Vascular Therapy Bemer (an acronym for Bio-Electro-Magnetic-Energy-Regulation), is an alternative medical treatment method that belongs to the field of magnet therapy. It was developed by the Liechtenstein-based company Bemer Int. AG.

== Method ==
Bemer therapy is a form of magnet therapy that uses electromagnetic pulses to improve microcirculation.

The method is based on the application of a specific signal transmitted to the body via mats or applicators, which generate a magnetic field. Unlike other magnet therapies, Bemer is not based on a magnetic waveform but on a complex signal intended to stimulate the movement (vasomotion) of the smallest blood vessels. The magnetic field is cyclically strengthened and weakened to create an additional electric field, which is also claimed to contribute to ion movement. This process is said to increase the oxygen supply to tissue, the number of open capillaries, and to improve blood flow in arterioles and venules.

The therapy is mainly used in complementary medicine to support regeneration, enhance physical performance, and for pain management, for example in cases of chronic pain or impaired wound healing.

== Criticism ==
Studies have reported positive effects of Bemer therapy, particularly as a supportive measure alongside conventional treatments. Bemer therapy is intended only to be used as a supplement to conventional treatment methods, not a replacement.
