= Precapillary sphincter =

Band of smooth muscle that adjusts blood flow into capillaries

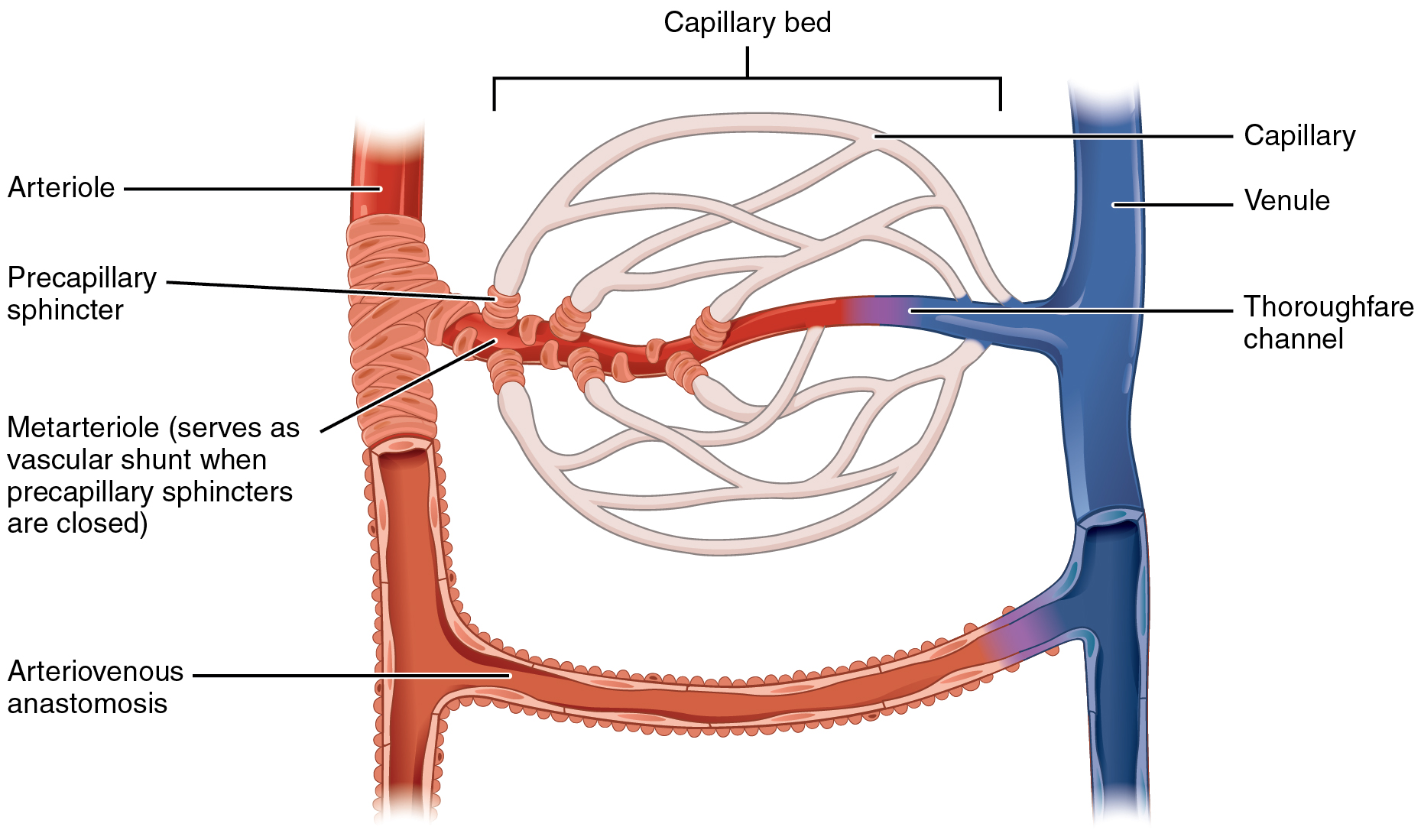
- Illustration of a capillary system with precapillary sphincters

A precapillary sphincter is a band of contractile mural cells either classified as smooth muscle or pericytes that adjusts blood flow into capillaries. They were originally described in the mesenteric microcirculation, and were thought to only reside there. At the point where each of the capillaries originates from an arteriole, contractile mural cells encircle the capillary. This is called the precapillary sphincter. The precapillary sphincter has now also been found in the brain, where it regulates blood flow to the capillary bed. A later review proposed that these precapillary sphincters at first-order capillaries in the brain help regulate capillary perfusion and protect downstream microvessels from pressure fluctuations. The sphincter can open and close the entrance to the capillary, by which contraction causes blood flow in a capillary to change as vasomotion occurs.

In some tissues, the entire capillary bed may be bypassed by blood flow through arteriovenous anastomoses or through preferential flow through metarterioles. If these anastomoses are closed, then capillary beds can become perfused, a process known as vascular recruitment. If the sphincter is damaged or cannot contract, blood can flow into the capillary bed at high pressures. When capillary pressures are high (as per gravity, etc.), fluid passes out of the capillaries into the interstitial space, and edema or fluid swelling is the result.

== Dispute over concept ==
Precapillary sphincters and metarterioles were discovered in the mesenteric circulation in the 1950s. Medical and physiological textbooks, such as Guyton, Boron and Fulton, etc. were quick to claim the existence of said sphincters and metarterioles all over the body, despite lack of evidence. At least since 1976 there has been considerable debate about the existence of precapillary sphincters and metarterioles. In 2020, precapillary sphincters were identified as a mechanism for controlling cerebral blood flow.
