= Mural cell =

Mural cells are a generalized cell population in the microcirculation that comprises vascular smooth muscle cells (vSMCs), and pericytes. Both types are in close contact with the endothelial cells lining the capillaries, and are important for vascular development and stability. The vasculature is a system of small, interconnected tubes that ensure there is proper blood flow to all of the organs. Mural cells are involved in the formation of normal vasculature and are responsive to factors including platelet-derived growth factor B (PDGFB) and vascular endothelial growth factor (VEGF). The weakness and disorganization of tumor vasculature is partly due to the inability of tumors to recruit properly organized mural cells.

== Function during angiogenesis ==
Mural cells, like pericytes, are important for how blood vessels work. During the growth of new blood vessels (a process called angiogenesis), pericytes help guide how endothelial cells grow and divide. This process relies on the ability of pericytes to contract. In developing mouse retinas, endothelial cells produce a signal called Pdgfb that attracts pericytes to the area where new blood vessels are forming. Pericytes also help control the amount of a growth factor called Vegfa by using a receptor (Vegfr1) that soaks it up. Without pericytes, there's too much Vegfa, which messes up how the blood vessels grow and branch.

Other research shows that pericytes release a protein called angiopoietin 1, which also helps control new blood vessel growth. Adding extra angiopoietin 1 can fix the blood vessel problems caused by a lack of pericytes. This signaling also helps keep pericytes alive and in place. In fact, removing the receptor for angiopoietin (Tie2) in pericytes can lead to more blood vessel growth in tumors, making them grow faster.

Overall, healthy blood vessel growth depends on teamwork between endothelial cells and pericytes. After the blood vessels have formed, pericytes also help fine-tune the network by causing some vessels to shrink and disappear.

== Establishment and regulation of the blood-brain barrier ==
Besides helping with blood vessel growth, mural cells like pericytes also play key roles in shaping blood vessels in specific organs. One important job they have is helping to build and maintain the blood–brain barrier—a protective shield that keeps harmful substances out of the brain.

The blood-brain barrier is made up of endothelial cells, pericytes, and the ends of astrocyte cells, all sitting on a shared support structure called the basement membrane. Pericytes help control how much passes through the blood-brain barrier by managing how endothelial cells move substances across their surface, how astrocyte ends are positioned, and by stopping unwanted proteins from building up in the brain. They also help endothelial cells form tight seals, known as tight junctions, between cells, which are crucial for keeping the barrier strong.

Pericytes can even influence which genes are turned on or off in endothelial cells. Overall, these mural cells work closely with endothelial cells to form and maintain the specialized blood vessels that different organs need—especially in the brain.

== Regulation of blood vessel diameters and flow ==
Once blood vessels are fully developed, mural cells help manage how blood moves through the brain—a process called neurovascular coupling. This ensures that active areas of the brain get more blood when needed, a response known as functional hyperaemia. Smooth muscle cells (SMCs) are well known for their ability to contract and relax, which allows them to adjust blood vessel width and regulate flow. How strongly these cells contract directly affects how much blood can pass through.

There is still ongoing debate about how much pericytes contribute to this process. Some researchers suggest dividing pericytes into subtypes—like ensheathing, mesh, and thin-strand pericytes—but the scientific community hasn’t reached agreement on these classifications yet, and terms like "capillary pericytes" are still used inconsistently.

When the brain is active, neurons and nearby support cells (astrocytes) release chemical signals that tell mural cells to either tighten or loosen, which changes the size of the blood vessels and directs blood to where it’s needed. A key molecule involved in this process is nitric oxide, which helps widen arterioles. On the other hand, astrocytes use a different molecule, arachidonic acid, to help open up smaller capillaries. These findings show that SMCs and pericytes may have distinct roles depending on the type and size of blood vessel involved.

In skeletal muscles, blood vessel widening and narrowing is carefully coordinated across branches to ensure muscles get enough oxygen during activity. This coordination is mostly handled by the sympathetic nervous system, which balances increased local blood flow with overall blood pressure. Nitric oxide from muscle cells or endothelial cells plays a role here too. In addition, sympathetic nerves release several chemicals—including noradrenaline and neuropeptide Y—that cause SMCs to contract, narrowing the vessels. Interestingly, the specific signals and receptors that control blood flow vary between the brain and other parts of the body. This highlights how mural cells adapt to the unique needs of different organs. Understanding how all these systems work together throughout the body remains a key area for future study.

== Cell type controversy ==
Mural cells were described for the first time in the late 19th century as contractile cells lining up around the endothelium. In reality, it was a variety of cells that had been observed and bundled up under the common name of Rouget cells. Later studies brought controversy about their contractility, and this remains an elusive point today.

Pericytes, vSMCs, and many other perivascular cell types express very similar markers such as Platelet Derived Growth Factor Receptor Beta (PDGFR-B), aminopeptidase-N (CD13), chondroitin sulfate proteoglycan 4 (Ng2), or desmin, which makes their identification difficult and requires a combination of markers: for example vSMCs but not pericytes express alpha-smooth muscle actin (ACTA2). Nowadays, distinctively characterizing these cells requires a combination of markers, cellular location and morphology.

== Role in cardiovascular disease and treatment ==
At one extreme, losing mural cells can weaken the support structure around blood vessels, particularly the endothelial barrier, which may lead to vascular problems. Scientist Juchem and colleagues found that mural cells may actually encourage blood clot formation, which can contribute to a condition called coronary no-reflow. This condition occurs when blood fails to return properly to the heart's small vessels after a blockage is cleared.

Mural cells are a major source of tissue factor (TF), a protein that helps start the body’s clotting process. When inflammation affects the heart's small vessels, it can trigger mural cells to release TF, kicking off a chain reaction that leads to blood clots and blocked vessel pathways. Also, mural cells may contribute to blocked blood flow by physically tightening and narrowing these vessels. In heart attack patients, this has been linked to higher levels of endothelin-1, a molecule that promotes vessel constriction. This results in an increase in contractile mural cells (marked by αSMA expression) and narrower vessel openings. These effects have also been seen in lab models of ischemia-reperfusion injury, pointing to mural cells as key players in no-reflow complications.

While vascular smooth muscle cells (VSMCs) are usually tied to atherosclerosis, mural cells have also been found in the inner layers of arteries. In mouse studies, after blood vessel injury, mural cells marked by NG2, PDGFRβ, and CD146 increased in the outer layer of blood vessels (adventitia) and moved inward. Since mural cell dysfunction is closely linked to fibrosis in the kidneys, researchers think a similar process might happen in the heart.

In heart disease, inflammatory immune cells like macrophages can release a protein called galectin-3, which causes mural cells to multiply and produce procollagen 1—a precursor to the collagen that forms scar tissue. This may lead to cardiac fibrosis. Additionally, heart mural cells may transform into myofibroblasts—the main cells responsible for producing scar tissue—when triggered by inflammation or TGFβ signaling. Some studies suggest this transformation happens in heart conditions like fibrocalcific aortic valve disease, where new blood vessel growth in the valve is strongly linked to disease progression. Notably, mural cells are frequently found near these new vessels and may contribute to the buildup of fibrous and calcified tissue.

Even though researchers are still figuring out how mural cells affect more common heart issues—like heart failure with preserved ejection fraction (HFpEF), heart enlargement (hypertrophy), or structural changes after damage—the topic is seen as highly promising and deserves more attention.

Encouragingly, recent research by Chen et al. showed the therapeutic potential of mural cells in heart repair. When mural cells taken from human skeletal muscle were injected into mice with heart damage, they significantly improved heart function. These cells helped rebuild heart tissue, reduced scarring, improved heart structure, and encouraged the growth of new blood vessels. The reduction in fibrosis was likely due to matrix metalloproteinases (MMPs) released by the mural cells. They also reduced inflammation by lowering the number of immune cells entering the damaged heart. Beyond heart disease, mural cells are already being explored as a promising cell therapy tool in other medical conditions, but research is still being conducted.

== Synchronous calcium activity and vasomotion ==
In many organs, small blood vessels such as arterioles, capillaries, and venules exhibit rhythmic contractions known as vasomotion. These spontaneous contractions are thought to help regulate blood flow into tissues and support waste removal. They are not primarily driven by nervous or hormonal signals but arise from the inherent electrical and chemical activity of mural cells—which include vascular smooth muscle cells (VSMCs) and pericytes.

A key driver of vasomotion is the synchronous release of calcium (Ca²⁺) within mural cells. These calcium signals, or spontaneous Ca²⁺ transients, originate from internal stores (the sarcoendoplasmic reticulum or SR/ER) and are coordinated through electrical connections between cells via gap junctions. This allows the signal to spread through a network of mural cells, ensuring coordinated contractions.

The calcium release is regulated by IP3 and ryanodine receptors in the SR/ER. Once released, Ca²⁺ activates calcium-activated chloride channels (CaCCs), causing membrane depolarization. This depolarization, in turn, opens voltage-dependent calcium channels (VDCCs)—both T-type and L-type—further amplifying calcium influx and synchronizing activity across cells.

The ability of mural cells to stay in sync also depends on maintaining the resting membrane potential within a narrow range. This is controlled by potassium channels such as Kv7 and inward rectifier K⁺ channels (Kir). If the membrane is too depolarized, the cells may fire irregularly; if too hyperpolarized, they may not fire at all. Disruption of this balance leads to loss of synchronized calcium transients and impaired vasomotion.

Morphologically, mural cells vary by vessel type. Arteriolar mural cells typically have circular, contractile arrangements. Capillary pericytes often appear non-contractile in some tissues but are capable of contraction in areas like the heart and brain, where they express α-smooth muscle actin (α-SMA). These cells are distributed in organized patterns and closely interact with endothelial cells, particularly in capillaries and postcapillary venules (PCVs).

Studies show that mural cell networks, especially in precapillary arterioles (PCAs) and PCVs, rely on gap junctions for synchrony. Blocking these junctions leads to irregular, unsynchronized calcium signals and impaired vasomotion. In some tissues, such as the bladder and stomach, capillary pericytes act as pacemakers, generating signals that propagate upstream to drive arteriolar vasomotion.

Voltage-dependent calcium channels play different roles depending on the vessel type. L-type channels are crucial in venules but not necessarily in PCAs. T-type channels influence frequency rather than synchronization in PCAs. Meanwhile, CaCCs are essential for initiating the depolarizations that trigger VDCC activation and subsequent Ca²⁺ waves.

The resting membrane potential is key to maintaining synchrony. Kv7 and Kir channels help maintain a slightly hyperpolarized state, preventing premature or disorganized calcium spikes. When these channels are blocked, cells become overly excitable and lose their coordinated activity. Restoration of membrane potential using agents like KATP channel openers can re-establish synchrony.

Endothelial cells also contribute by regulating ion flow and producing nitric oxide, which supports synchronized calcium signaling in mural cells. These cells can also pass electrical signals to mural cells via myoendothelial gap junctions, particularly in PCAs and capillaries.

Functionally, this coordinated activity supports proper tissue perfusion, especially during changes in organ pressure or metabolic demand. For example, in the bladder or stomach, vasomotion helps maintain oxygen and nutrient delivery during wall expansion. In the brain and retina, where blood flow is tightly regulated, disruption in mural cell function has been linked to diseases like diabetic retinopathy and no-reflow after ischemic injury.

In conclusion, spontaneous vasomotion and synchronized Ca²⁺ transients in mural cells are crucial for microvascular regulation. These processes rely on a delicate balance of internal calcium handling, membrane potential, and intercellular communication. Disruptions in any of these systems can impair blood flow and may contribute to various diseases, highlighting potential targets for future therapies.

== Neurodegenerative diseases ==
=== Alzheimer's disease ===
Alzheimer's disease is the most common neurodegenerative disorder in the world. It is mainly recognized by two features: amyloid-beta (Aβ) plaques that form outside nerve cells, and neurofibrillary tangles inside the cells made up of damaged tau proteins.

Research has shown that people with Alzheimer's disease or vascular dementia tend to have leakier blood-brain barriers compared to healthy older adults. The blood-brain barrier is crucial for protecting the brain and also helps clear out harmful substances, like Aβ protein. In healthy brains, pericytes—support cells that wrap around capillaries—play a major role in maintaining the blood-brain barrier and clearing Aβ.

In Alzheimer’s patients, studies (including work by Sengillo and colleagues) have found about a 30% drop in pericyte coverage of brain blood vessels. This loss appears to weaken the blood-brain barrier, allowing harmful substances to enter the brain more easily. A study by Sagare et al. further explored this connection, showing that mice with fewer pericytes and increased levels of APP (the protein that produces Aβ) formed plaques faster. It turns out that pericytes also help clear Aβ through a receptor called LRP1, but high levels of Aβ can actually damage or kill pericytes. This creates a harmful cycle—fewer pericytes lead to more Aβ buildup, which then causes even more pericyte loss.

Loss of pericytes and vascular smooth muscle cells (VSMCs) may also reduce blood flow to the brain, a common issue seen in Alzheimer's disease. Lower blood flow can mean less oxygen and nutrients reaching brain cells and less effective waste removal. This can lead to oxidative stress, more Aβ buildup, and eventually damage or death of neurons.

While environmental factors also contribute to Alzheimer’s (though the exact causes remain unclear), several genes have been linked to a higher risk of developing the disease. Large-scale genetic studies have identified genes like Apoe, ABCA7, App, Presenilin 1 (Psen1), and Presenilin 2 (Psen2) as being associated with Alzheimer's disease.

One of the most well-known risk genes is Apoe, especially its ε4 version (Apoe4), which appears in both early and late-onset cases of Alzheimer's disease. Apoe4 produces a version of the APOE protein that doesn't clear Aβ as effectively as other versions. Mutations in ABCA7 can lead to more activity of β-secretase, an enzyme that increases Aβ production.

App mutations (mainly seen in early-onset Alzheimer's disease) can cause the body to make more Aβ or change how it's processed, resulting in forms of Aβ that clump together more easily. Meanwhile, Psen1 and Psen2 affect how γ-secretase works, which is another key enzyme in the Aβ production pathway. Mutations in these genes also lead to more aggregation-prone Aβ.

It’s important to note that these are just the most commonly studied genes linked to Alzheimer’s. Other, rarer gene mutations—such as those in Notch3—may also play a role in how the disease develops.

=== Parkinson's disease ===
Parkinson's disease is another common neurodegenerative condition. It's most notably marked in the brain by Lewy bodies—abnormal clumps inside neurons made up of alpha-synuclein (αSyn) protein fibrils. These Lewy bodies are believed to cause the death of dopamine-producing neurons in an area called the substantia nigra, which is critical for controlling movement. This cell loss leads to the hallmark symptoms of Parkinson's disease, such as tremors and difficulties with walking. However, scientists are still working to fully understand exactly how αSyn fibrils cause this damage.

Compared to other brain diseases like Alzheimer's disease, the involvement of pericytes and vascular smooth muscle cells (vSMCs) in Parkinson's disease is less well understood. One area of interest is the role of tunneling nanotubes (TNTs)—tiny, actin-based bridges between cells that can transfer proteins and signals. Researchers believe that these nanotubes might help spread harmful protein clumps, like αSyn, from one cell to another, accelerating the disease.

A study by Dieriks et al. observed that pericytes in the olfactory bulb (a brain region related to smell) could absorb αSyn from nearby neurons—and even pass it along to other pericytes. This suggests that pericytes may be actively involved in the spread of αSyn through the brain. Another possible route for αSyn to travel is through secretion by one cell and uptake by another, though more research is needed to determine which mechanism is more dominant—or whether both are at play.

Beyond protein spread, breakdown of the blood-brain barrier has also been linked to Parkinson's disease. Post-mortem studies show that people with Parkinson's disease often have more leaky blood-brain barriers, and it has been suggested that even the non-aggregated (monomeric) form of αSyn could damage pericytes and contribute to this barrier breakdown.

Genetics also plays a key role in Parkinson's disease, especially in early-onset cases. However, even in sporadic (non-inherited) Parkinson's disease, several genes have been associated with increased risk:

- SNCA: This gene encodes the αSyn protein itself. Mutations often affect the beginning of the protein (N-terminus), making it more likely to form the harmful fibrils found in Lewy bodies.
- LRRK2: Encodes a kinase enzyme that helps control how microglia (the brain’s immune cells) clear αSyn. Certain mutations increase LRRK2 activity, which reduces αSyn cleanup, allowing it to build up.
- PRKN (Parkin): Encodes an enzyme that tags proteins for degradation. When this process fails due to mutations, various proteins build up, although their exact role in Parkinson's disease remains unclear.
- PINK1: Works closely with Parkin and is responsible for helping recruit it to damaged cell parts.
- DJ-1: Protects cells from oxidative stress and helps regulate immune responses.
- ATP13A2: Although not fully understood, it seems to help break down αSyn aggregates and may play a role in protecting cells.

Some of these genes linked to Parkinson’s have also been suggested to play roles in cardiovascular diseases, though this is an emerging area of study.

== Lineage and zonation ==
Typically, vSMCs wrap around larger vessels: they form a dense continuum spindling around arteries, arterioles and precapillary arterioles; while around postcapillary venules, vSMCs adopt a different morphology: individual cell bodies extending thing branching processes, that become more stellate-like around venules and veins. The cell body of pericytes has a round shape extending a few processes in a longitudinal fashion along the capillaries.

Recently, efforts have been undertaken using single cell sequencing on mural cells to try to characterize their molecular signature along the blood vessels. This showed that there is a zonation in their expression patterns by which they can be grouped into different subsets, but no singular markers have been found so far that can identify unequivocally any of the cell types.

== See also ==
- List of human cell types derived from the germ layers
