= Orthostatic syncope =

Fainting due to low blood pressure

Orthostatic syncope refers to syncope resulting from a postural decrease in blood pressure, termed orthostatic hypotension.

Orthostatic hypotension occurs when there is a persistent reduction in blood pressure of at least 20mmHg systolic or 10mmHg diastolic within three minutes of standing or being upright to 60 degrees on the head-up tilt table. In people with initial orthostatic hypotension, the decrease in blood pressure occurs within 15 seconds, while in those with delayed orthostatic hypotension it occurs after over three minutes of assuming an upright position.

== Signs and symptoms ==
Orthostatic syncope may occur suddenly with no warning or may be preceded by symptoms. Associated symptoms are usually because of cerebral hypoperfusion occurring in the upright position and include dizziness, feeling faint or nauseated, diaphoresis, a sense of warmth or blurred vision. Other general symptoms regardless of the position include a feeling of generalized weakness, headache, fatigue, cognitive slowing and shortness of breath.

Symptoms may be sudden or gradual, getting progressively worse until the patient loses consciousness. Patients may have a single episode with an identifiable precipitating factor or recurrent episodes without an overt, identifiable, precipitating factor.

Blood pressure and heart rate should be measured in supine and standing positions. As described above, orthostatic hypotension diagnosis is when there is a drop of greater than or equal to 20 mmHg or greater or equal to 10 mmHg in systolic and diastolic blood pressures, respectively within 3 minutes of standing. In the case of hypovolemia, there is also a compensatory rise in heart rate of greater than 15 beats/minute.

=== Complications ===
Complications of orthostatic syncope include:

1. Trauma or injury from falls during an episode of orthostatic syncope.
2. Stroke from changes in blood pressure due to decrease blood flow to the brain.
3. Cardiovascular complications including heart failure, chest pain, and arrhythmias.

== Etiology ==
There are multiple causes of orthostatic hypotension which could lead to syncope including neurally mediated (neurogenic) and non-neurally mediated causes.

Neurally mediated causes include conditions that cause either primary or secondary failure of the autonomic system:

- Peripheral neuropathy as seen in diabetes mellitus, alcoholics, nutritional (vitamin B12 deficiency), amyloidosis
- Idiopathic postural hypotension
- Multi-system atrophies (parkinsonism, progressive cerebellar degeneration, dementia with Lewy bodies)
- Acute dysautonomia (seen in a variant of Guillain–Barré syndrome)
- Toxin, drug or infection-induced neuropathy

Non-neurally mediated causes include:

- Medications (antihypertensives, vasodilators)
- Decreased blood volume (adrenal insufficiency, blood loss, dehydration, hypovolemia or decreased effective intravascular volume)
- Physical deconditioning
- Sympathectomy

== Pathophysiology ==
The autonomic nervous system regulates various body processes and comprises the sympathetic (adrenergic) and parasympathetic (cholinergic) nervous system. These systems work in balance to respond to changes throughout the body. When the body assumes an upright position, there is an immediate gravitational pooling of about 500 to 1000ml of blood to the lower extremities, splanchnic and pulmonary circulations. The decrease in venous return to the heart reduces cardiac output and eventually causes a drop in blood pressure. Baroreceptors in the carotid and aortic arteries sense this decrease in blood pressure and activate the sympathetic nervous system which leads to increased heart rate, systemic vasoconstriction, and increased cardiac muscle contractility all of which eventually increase blood pressure. In a healthy individual, this sympathetic activation causes a physiological increase in heart rate by 10 to 20 bpm, diastolic blood pressure by 5mmHg, but minimal to no change in systolic blood pressure. In patients with autonomic dysfunction, there is an inadequate engagement of the autonomic nervous system in response to a decrease in blood pressure leading to persistent hypotension.

== Diagnosis ==
Orthostatic vitals including blood pressure and heart rate in response to upright posture for at least 3 minutes is essential for the diagnosis of orthostatic syncope. A resting 12-lead electrocardiogram is useful to rule out arrhythmias. Targeted blood testing is reasonable including complete hematology, glycemic and metabolic profiles to rule out associated conditions such as anemia, metabolic or renal derangements. In selected patients with suspected neurodegenerative disease and syncope, referral for autonomic evaluation is reasonable to improve diagnostic and prognostic accuracy.

=== Differential Diagnosis ===
Differential diagnosis includes other causes of loss of consciousness:

- Seizures
- Hypoglycemia
- Concussion secondary to head trauma
- Drug or alcohol intoxication
- Metabolic conditions including hypothyroidism, hypoxemia

== Management ==
The history and physical examination are essential components in the evaluation of a patient with orthostatic syncope. The history may reveal a cause for hypovolemia such as vomiting, diarrhea, and decreased oral intake. Melena, hematemesis, hematuria, menorrhagia or hematochezia point to blood loss. Elderly deconditioned patients, especially after prolonged hospitalization, may have reduced muscle tone.

Review of the patients' medication list may show polypharmacy, culprit medications (including diuretics, vasodilators, other antihypertensives) and steroids (a clue to steroid-induced adrenal insufficiency).

Review of the past medical history will reveal associated predisposing medical conditions (diabetes, Parkinsonism, dementia). Patient compliance with both pharmacological and nonpharmacological therapy is recommended for successful treatment.

Treatment of orthostatic syncope depends on the underlying cause and includes both nonpharmacological and pharmacological measures.

Nonpharmacological treatment measures aim at either increasing venous return to the heart while decreasing venous pooling in the lower extremities or increasing blood volume to maintain blood pressure in the supine position and include:

1. Avoiding physical deconditioning in the elderly which helps maintain muscle tone in lower extremities
2. External compression devices such as waist-high compression stockings, abdominal binders
3. Physical maneuvers such as lunges, calf-raise, squatting, leg crossing
4. Review of home medications and discontinue diuretics and vasodilators if possible
5. Increase water and fluid intake to about 2-3 liters per day, avoid dehydration, bolus water ingestion of 500mls of water in 2 to 3 minutes especially in the morning
6. Dietary measures including liberal salt diet 6-10g/day, eating small frequent low carbohydrate meals a day in case of postprandial orthostatic hypotension, avoid alcohol intake
7. In patients with autonomic dysfunction and supine hypertension, raising the head of the bed to 10 degrees at night reduces nocturnal diuresis
8. Life style modification by avoiding activities that increase core temperature and cause peripheral vasodilatation such as avoiding saunas, spas, hot tubs, prolonged hot showers, and excessive high-intensity exercise

The goal of pharmacological treatment is to increase blood volume or peripheral vascular resistance and includes:

1. Midodrine 2.5 to 15 mg orally once to thrice daily
2. Fludrocortisone 0.1 to 0.2 mg daily in the morning titrated up to 1 mg daily if needed
3. Pyridostigmine 30 to 60 mg orally trice daily
4. Yohimbine 5.4 to 10.8 mg orally trice daily
5. Octreotide 12.5 to 50 ug subcutaneously twice daily
6. Cafergot such as caffeine 100 mg and ergotamine 100 mg

== Prognosis ==
Prognosis for orthostatic syncope depends on the underlying cause of orthostatic hypotension. The prognosis is good in non-neurally mediated orthostatic syncope once the cause of postural hypotension is identified and treated - fluid resuscitation in dehydration or volume depletion, transfusion for blood loss, discontinuation of offending antihypertensive medications. In neurally mediated syncope, prognosis depends on the course of the underlying medical condition. However, in the Framingham heart study, patients with syncope of unknown cause or neurologic syncope had an increased risk of death from any cause in multivariable-adjusted hazard ratios of 1.32 and 1.54 respectively.

Orthostatic hypotension is one of the most frequently identified causes of syncope in the general population. Effective treatment depends on determining the underlying etiology and instituting appropriate interventions to reduce the risk of harm to the patient. If the history suggests neurogenic orthostatic hypotension as a cause of syncope, a definitive diagnosis may require a complete autonomic workup and coordination of care between the primary care provider, cardiologist, and neurologist.

== Epidemiology ==
Orthostatic hypotension is more frequent in elderly patients because of multiple factors such as supine hypertension, age-related changes in baroreflexes and vasoconstrictor responses and a decrease in muscle tone, cardiac and vascular compliance. Neurogenic orthostatic hypotension showed a prevalence of 18% in patients older than 65 years and resulted in syncope in 9.4% of patients in the NIH funded Framingham cohort.
