= Olfactomedin-like 3 =

Protein found in humans

OLFML3

Identifiers
- Aliases: OLFML3, HNOEL-iso, OLF44, olfactomedin like 3
- External IDs: OMIM: 610088; MGI: 1914877; GeneCards: OLFML3

Gene location (Human)
Chr.	Chromosome 1 (human)
Band	1p13.2	Start	113,979,391 bp
Band	1p13.2	End	114,035,572 bp

Gene location (Mouse)
Chr.	Chromosome 3 (mouse)
Band	3|3 F2.2	Start	103,629,538 bp
Band	3|3 F2.2	End	103,645,317 bp
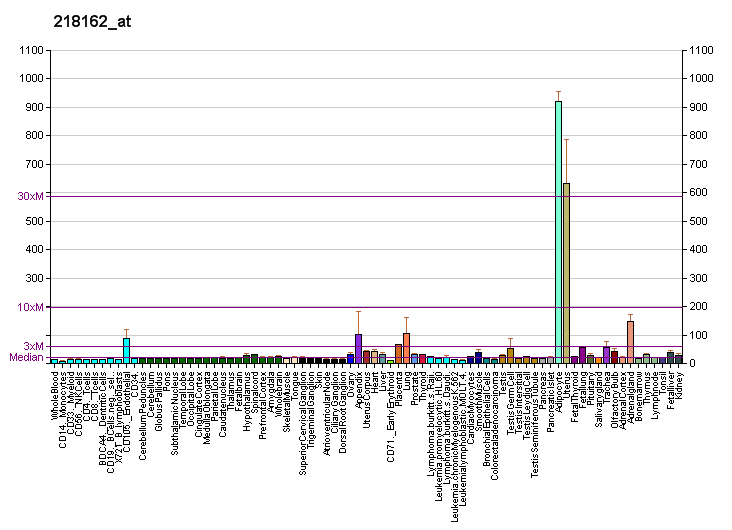
RNA expression pattern
Bgee	Human / Mouse (ortholog); Top expressed in: gallbladder; left uterine tube; body of uterus; right ovary; placenta; Achilles tendon; left ovary; canal of the cervix; smooth muscle tissue; myometrium / Top expressed in: genital tubercle; lip; Meckel's cartilage; right kidney; mandibular molars; Smooth muscle tissue of renal pelvis; tail of embryo; gastrula; lens; muscle of thigh; More reference expression data
BioGPS	More reference expression data
Orthologs
Databases	NCBI: entry; OMA: entry
Species	Human	Mouse
Entrez	56944	99543
Ensembl	ENSG00000116774	ENSMUSG00000027848
UniProt	Q9NRN5	Q8BK62
RefSeq (mRNA)	NM_020190; NM_001286352; NM_001286353	NM_133859
RefSeq (protein)	NP_001273281; NP_001273282; NP_064575; NP_064575.1	NP_598620
Location (UCSC)	Chr 1: 113.98 – 114.04 Mb	Chr 3: 103.63 – 103.65 Mb
PubMed search
- Wikidata
View/Edit Human	View/Edit Mouse

Olfactomedin-like protein 3 is a protein that in humans is encoded by the OLFML3 gene. It has been shown to act as a proangiongenic factor in the tumor microenvironment, being released by endothelial cells and pericytes.

This gene has also been associated with pectinate ligament dysplasia and glaucoma in Border Collies.
