= Vasodilation =

Widening of blood vessels

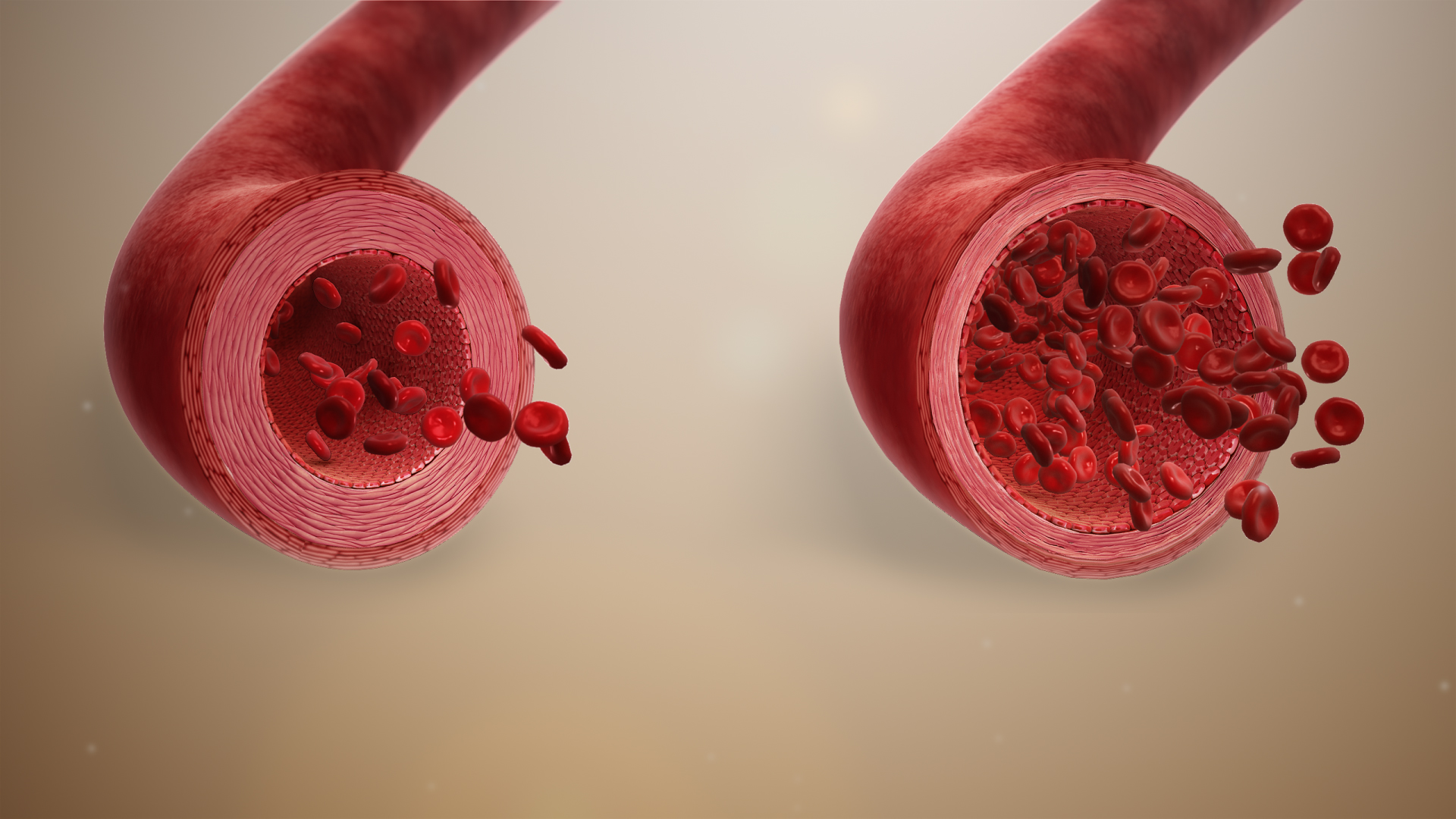
Normal blood vessel (left) vs. vasodilation (right)

Vasodilation, also known as vasorelaxation, is the widening of blood vessels. It results from relaxation of smooth muscle cells within the vessel walls, in particular in the large veins, large arteries, and smaller arterioles. Blood vessel walls are composed of endothelial tissue and a basal membrane lining the lumen of the vessel, concentric smooth muscle layers on top of endothelial tissue, and an adventitia over the smooth muscle layers. Relaxation of the smooth muscle layer allows the blood vessel to dilate, as it is held in a semi-constricted state by sympathetic nervous system activity. Vasodilation is the opposite of vasoconstriction, which is the narrowing of blood vessels.

When blood vessels dilate, the flow of blood is increased due to a decrease in vascular resistance and increase in cardiac output. Vascular resistance is the amount of force circulating blood must overcome in order to allow perfusion of body tissues. Narrow vessels create more vascular resistance, while dilated vessels decrease vascular resistance. Vasodilation acts to increase cardiac output by decreasing afterload, one of the four determinants of cardiac output.

By expanding available area for blood to circulate, vasodilation decreases blood pressure. The response may be intrinsic (due to local processes in the surrounding tissue) or extrinsic (due to hormones or the nervous system). In addition, the response may be localized to a specific organ (depending on the metabolic needs of a particular tissue, as during strenuous exercise), or it may be systemic (seen throughout the entire systemic circulation).

Endogenous substances and drugs that cause vasodilation are termed vasodilators. Many of these substances are neurotransmitters released by perivascular nerves of the autonomic nervous system. Baroreceptors sense blood pressure and allow adaptation via the mechanisms of vasoconstriction or vasodilation to maintain homeostasis.

== Function ==
The primary function of vasodilation is to increase blood flow in the body to tissues that need it most. This is often in response to a localized need for oxygen but can occur when the tissue in question is not receiving enough glucose, lipids, or other nutrients. Vasodilation, both localized and systemic, also facilitates immune response. Localized tissues have multiple ways to increase blood flow, including releasing vasodilators, primarily adenosine, into the local interstitial fluid, which diffuses to capillary beds, provoking local vasodilation. Some physiologists have suggested that it is the lack of oxygen itself that causes capillary beds to vasodilate by the smooth muscle hypoxia of the vessels in the region. This latter hypothesis is posited due to the presence of precapillary sphincters in capillary beds. These approaches to the mechanism of vasodilation have not been found to be mutually exclusive. Either mechanism can lead to an increase in flow through perfused capillaries or vascular recruitment of new capillaries.

=== Immune system ===
Vasodilation plays a major role in immune system function. Wider blood vessels allow more blood containing immune cells and proteins to reach the infection site. Vasodilation occurs as part of the process of inflammation, which is caused by several factors including presence of a pathogen, injury to tissues or blood vessels, and immune complexes. In severe cases, inflammation can lead to sepsis or distributive shock. Vasodilation is also a major component of anaphylaxis.

Inflammation causes not only vasodilation but also causes increased vascular permeability, allowing neutrophils, complement proteins, and antibodies to reach the site of infection or damage. Elevated vascular permeability can allow excess fluid to leave blood vessels and collect in tissues resulting in edema; vasodilation prevents blood vessels from constricting to adapt to reduced volume in the vessels, causing low blood pressure and septic shock.

In the case of inflammation, vasodilation is caused by cytokines. Interferon gamma, TNF-a, interleukin 1 beta, and interleukin 12 are a few examples of some inflammatory cytokines produced by immune cells such as natural killer cells, B cells, T cells, mast cells and macrophages. Anti-inflammatory cytokines that regulate inflammation and help prevent negative results such as septic shock are also produced by these immune cells. Vasodilation and increased vascular permeability also allow immune effector cells to leave blood vessels and follow chemoattractants to the infection site via a process called leukocyte extravasation. Vasodilation allows the same volume of blood to move more slowly according to the flow rate equation Q = Av, where Q represents flow rate, A represents cross-sectional area, and v represents velocity. Immune effector cells can more easily attach to selectins expressed on endothelial cells when blood is flowing slowly, enabling these cells to exit the blood vessel via diapedesis.

Anaphylaxis is a severe allergic reaction characterized by elevated vascular permeability, systemic vasodilation, gastrointestinal dysfunction, and respiratory dysfunction. Anaphylatoxins, specifically complement proteins C3a and C5a, bind to receptors on mast cells and basophils causing degranulation. Granules in these cells contain histamine, platelet-activating factor, and other compounds causing clinical manifestation of anaphylaxis- including systemic vasodilation causing dangerously low blood pressure. Immunoglobulin E, an antibody produced by plasma cells, also binds to receptors on mast cells and basophils causing degranulation.

== Mechanism ==
A basic understanding of cardiac output, vascular resistance, and blood pressure is necessary to understand the causes and impacts of vasodilation. Cardiac output is defined as the amount of blood pumped through the heart over 1 minute, in units of liters per minute, equal to heart rate multiplied by stroke volume. It is directly related to heart rate, myocardial contractility, and preload, and inversely related with afterload. Elevated vascular resistance due to constricted blood vessels causes in increase in afterload, the amount of force against which the heart must contract. Vasodilation therefore decreases vascular resistance, which decreases afterload, elevating cardiac output and allowing perfusion of tissues. Blood pressure measures how much pressure blood exerts on blood vessel walls; systolic blood pressure measures pressure while the heart contracts (systole), and diastolic blood pressure reflects pressure between contractions (diastole). Mean arterial pressure (MAP)is a weighted average of systolic and diastolic blood pressures, and is a better measurement of perfusion over the duration of the cardiac cycle. Vasodilation works to decrease vascular resistance and blood pressure through relaxation of smooth muscle cells in the tunica media layer of large arteries and smaller arterioles. When vasodilation causes systolic blood pressure to fall below 90 mmHg, circulatory shock is observed.

Vascular resistance depends on several factors, including the length of the vessel, the viscosity of blood (determined by hematocrit) and the diameter of the blood vessel. The latter is the most important variable in determining resistance, with the vascular resistance changing by the fourth power of the radius. An increase in either of these physiological components (cardiac output or vascular resistance) causes a rise in MAP. Arterioles create the most vascular resistance of any blood vessel type, as they are very narrow and possess concentric layers of smooth muscle unlike venules and capillaries.

Vasodilation occurs in superficial blood vessels of warm-blooded animals when their ambient environment is hot; this process diverts the flow of heated blood to the skin of the animal, where heat can be more easily released to the environment. The opposite physiological process is vasoconstriction. These processes are naturally modulated by local paracrine agents from endothelial cells (e.g., nitric oxide, bradykinin, potassium ions, and adenosine), and by the autonomic nervous system and the adrenal glands, both of which secrete catecholamines, such as norepinephrine and epinephrine, respectively.

=== Smooth muscle physiology ===
The tunica media of the walls of arteries, arterioles, and veins is composed of smooth muscle and causes vasodilation and vasoconstriction. Contraction of smooth muscle cells causes vasoconstriction, and relaxation of smooth muscle causes vasodilation. Smooth muscle is innervated by the autonomic nervous system and is non-striated (does not contain sarcomeres). Contraction is dependent on concentrations of Ca^{2+} in the cytosol, either via Ca,Mg-ATPase from the sarcoplasmic reticulum or voltage-gated calcium channels from the extracellular matrix. Calcium ions bind with calmodulin, activating myosin light-chain kinase which phosphorylates the myosin light-chain. Phosphorylated light-chain myosin interacts with actin filaments forming a cross-bridge, allowing muscle contraction causing vasoconstriction. Vasodilation is caused by myosin-light-chain phosphatase, which dephosphorylates the myosin light chain causing muscle relaxation. Smooth muscle cells can remain contracted without use of ATP due to action of the myosin-binding subunit of myosin light-chain phosphatase. Phosphorylation of this subunit by Rho-kinase prevents it from binding to and dephosphorylating the myosin light-chain, allowing the cell to remain contracted.

Vasodilation is the result of relaxation in smooth muscle surrounding the blood vessels. This relaxation, in turn, relies on removing the stimulus for contraction, which depends on intracellular calcium ion concentrations and is tightly linked with phosphorylation of the light chain of the contractile protein myosin. Thus, vasodilation works mainly either by lowering intracellular calcium concentration or by dephosphorylation (really substitution of ATP for ADP) of myosin. Dephosphorylation by myosin light-chain phosphatase and induction of calcium symporters and antiporters that pump calcium ions out of the intracellular compartment both contribute to smooth muscle cell relaxation and therefore vasodilation. This is accomplished through reuptake of ions into the sarcoplasmic reticulum via exchangers and expulsion across the plasma membrane. There are three main intracellular stimuli that can result in the vasodilation of blood vessels. The specific mechanisms to accomplish these effects vary from vasodilator to vasodilator.

Class	Description	Example
Hyperpolarization-mediated (Calcium channel blocker)	Changes in the resting membrane potential of the cell affects the level of intracellular calcium through modulation of voltage-sensitive calcium channels in the plasma membrane.	adenosine
cAMP-mediated	Adrenergic stimulation results in elevated levels of cAMP and protein kinase A, which results in increasing calcium removal from the cytoplasm.	prostacyclin
cGMP-mediated (Nitrovasodilator)	Through stimulation of protein kinase G.	nitric oxide

PDE5 inhibitors and potassium channel openers can also have similar results.

Compounds that mediate the above mechanisms may be grouped as endogenous and exogenous.

== Causes ==
=== Endogenous ===
Vasodilators	Receptor (↑ = opens. ↓ = closes) On vascular smooth muscle cells if not otherwise specified	Transduction (↑ = increases. ↓ = decreases)
EDHF	?	hyperpolarization → ↓VDCC → ↓intracellular Ca^{2+}
PKG activity →: phosphorylation of MLCK → ↓MLCK activity → dephosphorylation of MLC; ↑SERCA → ↓intracellular Ca^{2+}		hyperpolarization → ↓VDCC → ↓intracellular Ca^{2+}
NO receptor on endothelium	↓endothelin synthesis	hyperpolarization → ↓VDCC → ↓intracellular Ca^{2+}
epinephrine (adrenaline) (Vasoconstrictor)	β-2 adrenergic receptor	↑G_{s} activity → ↑AC activity → ↑cAMP → ↑PKA activity → phosphorylation of MLCK → ↓MLCK activity → dephosphorylation of MLC
histamine	histamine H2 receptor	↑G_{s} activity → ↑AC activity → ↑cAMP → ↑PKA activity → phosphorylation of MLCK → ↓MLCK activity → dephosphorylation of MLC
prostacyclin	IP receptor	↑G_{s} activity → ↑AC activity → ↑cAMP → ↑PKA activity → phosphorylation of MLCK → ↓MLCK activity → dephosphorylation of MLC
prostaglandin D_{2}	DP receptor	↑G_{s} activity → ↑AC activity → ↑cAMP → ↑PKA activity → phosphorylation of MLCK → ↓MLCK activity → dephosphorylation of MLC
prostaglandin E_{2}	EP receptor	↑G_{s} activity → ↑AC activity → ↑cAMP → ↑PKA activity → phosphorylation of MLCK → ↓MLCK activity → dephosphorylation of MLC
VIP	VIP receptor	↑G_{s} activity → ↑AC activity → ↑cAMP → ↑PKA activity →: phosphorylation of MLCK → ↓MLCK activity → dephosphorylation of MLC; open Ca^{2+}-activated and voltage-gated K^{+}channels → hyperpolarization → close VDCC → ↓intracellular Ca^{2+}
(extracellular) adenosine	A_{1}, A_{2a} and A_{2b} adenosine receptors	↑ATP-sensitive K^{+} channel → hyperpolarization → close VDCC → ↓intracellular Ca^{2+}
(extracellular) ATP; (extracellular) ADP	↑P2Y receptor	activate G_{q} → ↑PLC activity → ↑intracellular Ca^{2+} → ↑NOS activity → ↑NO → (see nitric oxide)
L-arginine	imidazoline and α-2 receptor?	G_{i} → ↓cAMP → activation of Na^{+}/K^{+}-ATPase → ↓intracellular Na^{+} → ↑Na^{+}/Ca^{2+} exchanger activity → ↓intracellular Ca^{2+}
bradykinin	bradykinin receptor	
substance P		
niacin (as nicotinic acid only)		
platelet-activating factor (PAF)		
CO_{2}	-	↓interstitial pH → ?
interstitial lactic acid (probably)	-	↓interstitial pH → ?
muscle work	-	↑vasodilators: ↑ATP consumption → ↑adenosine; ↑glucose usage → CO_{2}; ↑interstitial K^{+}; ↑(extracellular) ATP; ↑(extracellular) ADP; ↑interstitial K^{+}; ↓vasoconstrictors: ↑ATP consumption → ↓ ATP (intracellular); ↓oxygen → ↓oxidative phosphorylation → ↓ ATP (intracellular)
natriuretic peptides; prostaglandin I_{2}; prostaglandin E_{2}; heparin	various receptors on endothelium	↓endothelin synthesis

The vasodilating action of activation of beta-2 receptors (such as by adrenaline) appears to be endothelium-independent.

=== Autonomic nervous system control ===
As referenced in the explanation of smooth muscle physiology, smooth muscle within the tunica media is innervated by the autonomic nervous system. The autonomic nervous system (ANS) controls essential involuntary body functions and originates as nerves leaving the brain stem or spinal cord; it contains both sensor and motor nerves. The two divisions of the ANS, the sympathetic nervous system (SNS) and the parasympathetic nervous system (PSNS), impact blood vessels differently. Traditionally we understand that these two divisions work against each other, the SNS producing "fight or flight" and the PSNS producing "rest and digest", but in the case of vascular innervation this line becomes blurred ANS nerves do not directly innervate the vasculature via synapses with muscle cells; instead, they release neurotransmitters that reach target cells and effect smooth muscle contraction or relaxation. Physical characteristics of the SNS and PSNS cause the SNS to have a prolonged, systemic impact on blood vessels, while the PSNS causes short-lived, localized change. SNS stimulation causes a base level of vasoconstriction often referred to as basal neural tone, maintaining blood pressure. Often vasodilation is simply the result of insufficient neurotransmitter to maintain basal neural tone, without the presence of a compound directly causing vasodilation.

Neurotransmitters can act by binding directly to smooth muscle cells or by binding to endothelial cells mediating the effects of the neurotransmitter. Below is a table summarizing major neurotransmitters involved in regulation of the vasculature.

Neurotransmitter	Sympathetic or Parasympathetic	Target Cells and Receptors	Impact on Vasculature
norepinephrine (NE)	sympathetic (mostly)	adrenergic receptors α1, α2, β1, β2 α1- smooth muscle α2- endothelial β1, β2- smooth muscle	α1- increase concentration calcium ions, vasoconstricton α2- inhibit cAMP, release NO, vasodilation β1, β2- possible vasodilation
Acetylcholine (Ach)	parasympathetic	nicotonic Ach receptors (nAchRs) muscanaric Ach receptors (mAchRs) - on both endothelial and smooth muscle cells	nAchRs- modulate cytokines, counteract inflammation mAchRs- endothelial M3 AchR release NO, vasodlation smooth muscle M2 and M3 AchRs reduce release NO, vasoconstriction Note: Ach is quickly broken down, diffused, or undergoes reuptake, impacts are brief and localized
Adenosine triphosphate (ATP)	sympathetic	purinergic receptors on smooth muscle and endothelial cells	smooth muscle- increase calcium ion concentration, vasoconstriction endothelium- possible role as mediator of hyperpolarization of smooth muscle cells co-released with norepinephrine
Neuropeptide Y (NPY)	sympathetic	receptors on endothelial cells	causes vasoconstriction when co-released with norepinephrine
CGRP	?	CGRP1, CGRP2 receptors in endothelium	vasodilation, role in vascular dysfunction if levels are abnormal

Also worthy of mention when discussing neural control of vasodilation is the renin-angiotensin-aldosterone system, or RAAS. The kidneys retain water by reabsorbing sodium ions, or eliminate water by eliminating sodium ions. Sympathetic nervous system activity, reduced blood volume or reduced arterial pressure trigger β-adrenergic receptors in select kidney cells to release renin, which converts facilitates formation of angiotensin II from its substrate angiotensin. Angiotensin II triggers adrenal glands to secrete aldosterone, a potent vasoconstrictor.

Epinephrine, either exogenous or endogenous, is another vasoconstrictor released by the adrenal glands in response to stress. It binds to α and β adrenergic receptors like norepinephrine, causing vasodilation and vasoconstriction in different body parts to redistribute circulation to critical areas.

=== Cold-induced ===
Cold-induced vasodilation (CIVD) occurs after cold exposure, possibly to reduce the risk of injury. It can take place in several locations in the human body but is observed most often in the extremities. The fingers are especially common because they are exposed most often.

When the fingers are exposed to cold, vasoconstriction occurs first to reduce heat loss, resulting in strong cooling of the fingers. Approximately five to ten minutes after the start of the cold exposure of the hand, the blood vessels in the finger tips will suddenly vasodilate. This is probably caused by a sudden decrease in the release of neurotransmitters from the sympathetic nerves to the muscular coat of the arteriovenous anastomoses due to local cold. The CIVD increases blood flow and subsequently the temperature of the fingers. This can be painful and is sometimes known as the 'hot aches' which can be painful enough to bring on vomiting.

A new phase of vasoconstriction follows the vasodilation, after which the process repeats itself. This is called the Hunting reaction. Experiments have shown that three other vascular responses to immersion of the finger in cold water are possible: a continuous state of vasoconstriction; slow, steady, and continuous rewarming; and a proportional control form in which the blood vessel diameter remains constant after an initial phase of vasoconstriction. However, the vast majority of responses can be classified as the Hunting reaction.

=== Miscellaneous ===
- Other suggested vasodilators or vasodilating factors include:
  - absence of high levels of environmental noise
  - adenosine - adenosine agonist, used primarily as an anti-arrhythmic
  - alpha blockers (block the vasoconstricting effect of adrenaline)
  - atrial natriuretic peptide (ANP) - a weak vasodilator
  - ethanol (alcohol) causes immediate vasodilation followed by increase in blood pressure
  - nitric oxide inducers
    - l-arginine (a key amino acid)
    - citrulline (causes increased levels of L-arginine in the body)
    - glyceryl trinitrate (commonly known as nitroglycerin)
    - isosorbide mononitrate and isosorbide dinitrate
    - pentaerythritol tetranitrate (PETN)
    - sodium nitroprusside
    - PDE5 inhibitors: these agents indirectly increase the effects of nitric oxide
      - sildenafil (Viagra)
      - tadalafil (Cialis)
      - vardenafil (Levitra)
  - tetrahydrocannabinol (THC), the principal psychoactive constituent of cannabis
  - theobromine, the principal alkaloid found in Theobroma cacao, specifically in (non-fat) cocoa solids (which are especially concentrated in defatted cocoa and dark chocolate)
  - minoxidil
  - papaverine an alkaloid found in the opium poppy papaver somniferum
  - estrogen

== Treatment ==
=== Direct vasodilation drugs ===
These drugs can keep vessels staying opened or help vessels refrain from being narrowed.

- Angiotensin II receptor blockers
- ACE inhibitors
- Calcium channel blockers

=== Alpha-2A adrenergic receptor agonists ===
Drugs that appear to work by activating the α_{2A} receptors in the brain thereby decreasing sympathetic nervous system activity.

- methyldopa

According to American Heart Association, Alpha-methyldopa may cause Orthostatic syncope as it exerts a greater blood pressure lowering effect when one is standing upright which may lead to feeling weak or fainting if the blood pressure has been lowered too far. Methyldopa's prominent side effects include drowsiness or sluggishness, dryness of the mouth, fever or anemia. Additionally to these, male patients may experience impotence.

- clonidine hydrochloride
- guanabenz acetate
- guanfacine hydrochloride

Clonidine, guanabenz or guanfacine may give rise to severe dryness of the mouth, constipation or drowsiness. Abrupt cessation taking may raise blood pressure quickly to dangerously high levels.

=== Blood vessel muscle relaxants ===
Directly relax the muscle in the walls of the blood vessels (especially the arterioles), allowing the vessel to dilate (widen).

- hydralazine
- minoxidil

Hydralazine may cause headaches, swelling around the eyes, heart palpitations or aches and pains in the joints. In clinical setting, hydralazine is not usually used alone.
Minoxidil is a potent direct vasodilator used only in resistant severe high blood pressure or when kidney failure is present. Noted adverse effects comprise fluid retention (marked weight gain) and excessive hair growth.

== Therapeutic applications ==
Vasodilators are used to treat conditions such as hypertension, wherein the patient has an abnormally high blood pressure, as well as angina, congestive heart failure, and erectile dysfunction, and where maintaining a lower blood pressure reduces the patient's risk of developing other cardiac problems. Flushing may be a physiological response to vasodilators. Some phosphodiesterase inhibitors such as sildenafil, vardenafil and tadalafil, work to increase blood flow in the penis through vasodilation. They may also be used to treat pulmonary arterial hypertension (PAH).

== See also ==
- Arteriolar vasodilator
- Nitrophorin
- Vasodilatory shock
- Vasoconstriction
