= Metarteriole =

Microvessel linking arterioles and capillaries

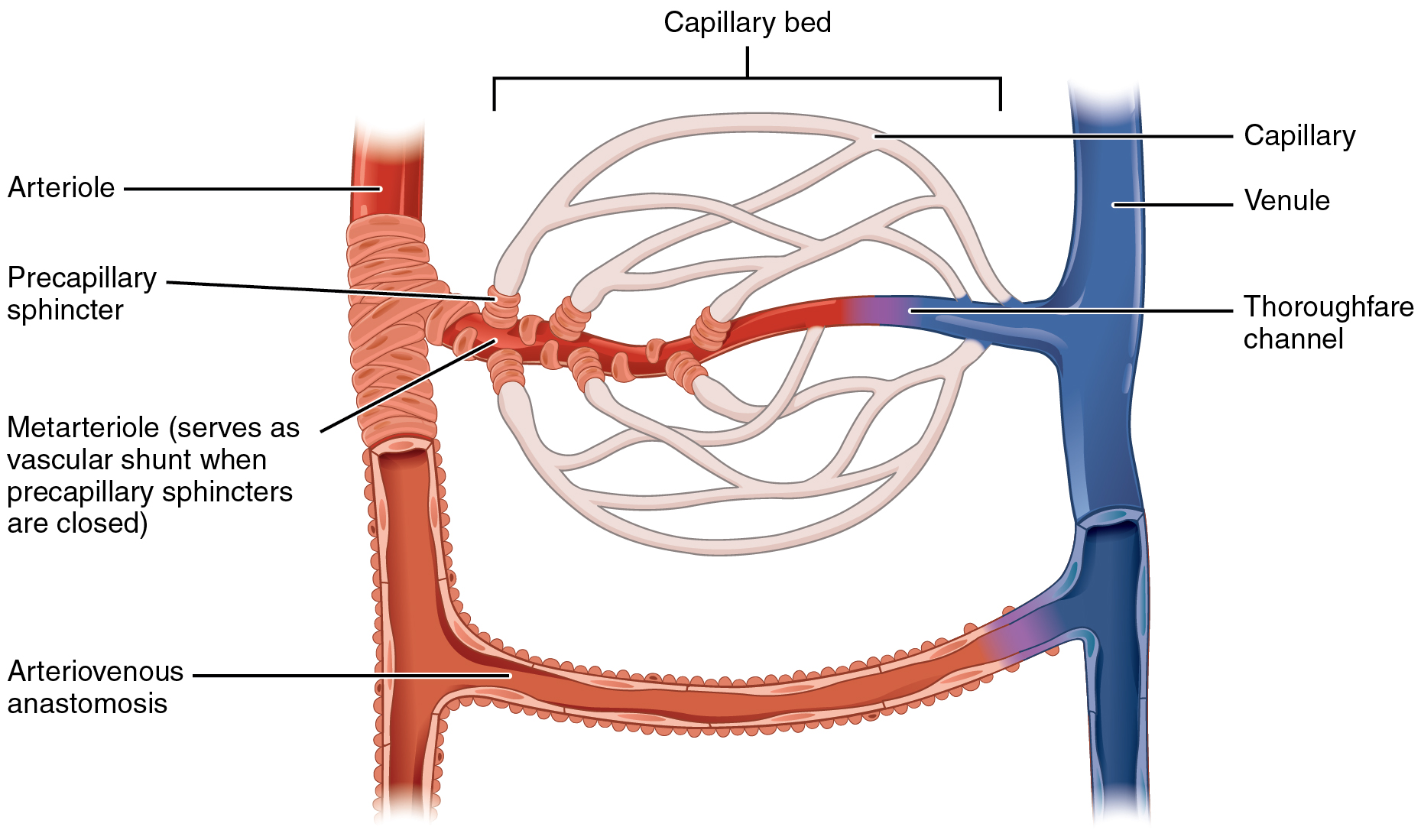
- Illustration of a capillary system with metarterioles and precapillary sphincters, as is present in the mesenteric microcirculation.

A metarteriole is a short microvessel in the microcirculation that links arterioles and capillaries. Instead of a continuous tunica media, they have individual smooth muscle cells placed a short distance apart, each forming a precapillary sphincter that encircles the entrance to that capillary bed. Constriction of these sphincters reduces or shuts off blood flow through their respective capillary beds. This allows the blood to be diverted to elsewhere in the body. Metarterioles also function as key regulators of microvascular perfusion by dynamically adjusting resistance in response to local metabolic cues such as tissue hypoxia.

Metarterioles exist in the mesenteric microcirculation, and the name was originally conceived only to define the "thoroughfare channels" between arterioles and venules. In recent times the term has often been used instead to describe the smallest arterioles directly prior to the capillaries.
