= Microcirculatory Society =

The Microcirculatory Society, Inc. was the first scientific society founded to promote research and teaching in the field of microcirculation. Although many members come from all over the world, most of its membership comes from the United States and Canada. Other societies have subsequently been formed to represent specific global regions, including the European Society for Microcirculation, the Asian Union for Microcirculation and the Australia & New Zealand Microcirculation Society, as well as individual countries, such as Britain, Japan, Germany, France, Hungary, Israel, Italy, China, the Netherlands, Switzerland, and others. The Microcirculatory Society publishes the scientific journal Microcirculation in conjunction with the British Microcirculation Society.

== History ==
The society was founded in 1953. Its first president was Edward H Bloch.
Society Presidents have been:
2011-2012: Boegehold, Matthew A.
2010-2011: Zawieja, David C.
2009-2010: Jackson, William F.
2008-2009: Segal, Steven S.
2007-2008: Meininger, Cynthia
2006-2007: Secomb, Timothy W.
2005-2006: Hester, Robert L.
2004-2005: Bohlen, H. Glenn
2003-2004: Schmid-Schönbein, Geert
2002-2003: McDonagh, Paul F.
2001-2002: Sarelius, Ingrid H.
2000-2001: Durán, Walter
1999-2000: Tuma, Ronald F.
1998-1999: Klitzman, Bruce
1997-1998: Lombard, Julian H.
1996-1997: Huxley, Virginia H.
1995-1996: Meininger, Gerald A.
1994-1995: Curry, Fitz-Roy E.
1993-1994: Pittman, Roland N.
1992-1993: Lipowsky, Herbert H.
1991-1992: Granger, D. Neil
1990-1991: Bassingthwaighte, James B.
1989-1990: Granger, Harris J.
1988-1989: Gore, Robert W.
1987-1988: Joyner, William L.
1986-1987: Harris, Patrick D.
1985-1986: Intaglietta, Marcos
1984-1985: Duling, Brian R.
1983-1984: Groom, Alan C.
1982-1983: Taylor, Aubrey E.
NOTE: Mary P. Wiedeman died before taking
office and Dr. Taylor continued as President
1981-1982: Taylor, Aubrey E.
1980-1981: Chien, Shu
1979-1980: Zweifach, Benjamin W.
1978-1979: Staub, Norman C.
1977-1978: Diana, John N.
1976-1977: Gross, Joseph F.
1975-1976: Frasher, Wallace G.
1974-1975: Renkin, Eugene M.
1973-1974: Wells, Roe
1972-1973: Berman, Herbert J.
1971-1972: Wayland, Harold J.
1970-1971: Nicoll, Paul A.
1969-1970: Wiederhielm, Curt A.
1968-1969: Baez, Silvio A.
1967-1968: Johnson, Paul C.
1966-1967: Sobin, Sidney S.
1965-1966: Sobin, Sidney S.
1964-1965: Wood, Sumner
1963-1964: Wiedeman, Mary P.
1962-1963: Worthington, W. Curtis
1961-1962: Knisely, William H.
1960-1961: Zweifach, Benjamin W.
1959-1960: Irwin, John
1958-1959: Fowler, Edmund P.
1957-1958: Reynolds, S.R.M.
1956-1957: Ebert, Robert H.
1955-1956: Fulton, George P.
1954-1955: Fulton, George P
1953-1954: Bloch, Edward H.
