= Mesoangioblast =

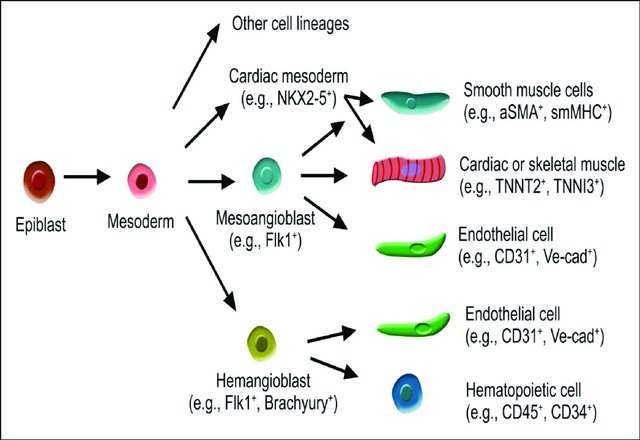
A schematic figure showing mesoangioblast and hemangioblast origin and fates.

A mesoangioblast is a type of progenitor cell that is associated with vasculature walls. Mesoangioblasts exhibit many similarities to pericytes, which are found in the small vessels. Mesoangioblasts are multipotent stem cells with the potential to progress down the endothelial or mesodermal lineages. Mesoangioblasts express the critical marker of angiopoietic progenitors, KDR (FLK1). Because of these properties, mesoangioblasts are a precursor of skeletal, smooth, and cardiac muscle cells along with endothelial cells. Research has suggested their application for stem cell therapies for muscular dystrophy and cardiovascular disease.

== Discovery and properties ==
Mesoangioblasts were initially isolated in 1997 by researchers at San Raffaele Scientific Institute in Milan, Italy. Their discovery was sparked by the findings of Mavilio et al., who found that a skeletal muscle precursor could be found in postnatal mice bone marrow. This instigated the search for cells that could differentiate into cells of the mesodermal tissue. Additionally, it was theorized that stem cells could also be found in the embryonic dorsal aorta, which furthered interest in the subject matter.

To explore into this topic, Cossu et al. cloned murine embryonic organs and, after analysis, found cells in the dorsal aorta clones that were able to differentiate into skeletal myogenic progenitors that expressed myogenic markers like MyoD, Myf-5, and desmin. These cells also expressed endothelial markers like VE-cadherin, VEGF-R2, and β3 integrin. When these cells were combined with satellite cells from wt P10 mice and cultured, the two cell types were able to coalesce and regenerate skeletal muscle in vivo. Experiments were also conducted using quail dorsal aorta cells transplanted into the wings of chick embryos. Quail donor cells colonized the vascular walls of chick wings, being especially prominent in skeletal muscle. Aorta-derived cells also differentiated into chondrocytes, smooth muscle cells, and bone cells. From these findings, researchers concluded that the donor cells are involved with the developing mesoderm and vasculature of host tissues. Thus, these cells that act as a progenitor for mesodermal tissues were named "mesoangioblasts".

== Characteristics ==
=== Potential Origins ===
Mesoangioblasts can first be isolated at the stage of development when ten to twelve somites are present. At this stage, the dorsal aorta consists mainly of an endothelial layer with a few mesenchymal cells on the abluminal side. It is unknown if mesoangioblasts are limited to certain areas in the aorta at this time. However, the roof and lateral walls of the dorsal aorta known to have cells that can differentiate into muscle cells or even more cell types, otherwise known as bona fide mesoangioblasts.

Another proposed source of mesoangioblasts comes from a region underneath the aortic floor endothelium, termed the human Aorta-Gonad-Mesonephros (AGM) region, where hematopoiesis occurs. This theory describes that mesoangioblasts act as the precursors to certain cells in this region, as there is a possibility of a hematopoiesis-supporting element that contains mesodermal tissue progenitors. Another prediction of mesoangioblast origin is that they may originate from post-natal bone marrow, which contains skeletal tissue progenitors that may be able to undergo myogenic differentiation. Another possible origin is from skeletal muscles, but their markers are different than those of aorta-derived mesoangioblasts. Along with this, they undergo senescence after multiple passages, unlike aorta-derived mesoangioblasts, which continue to divide and self-renew.

=== Properties ===
One of the most significant properties of mesoangioblasts is their multipotency. Mesoangioblasts have the ability to differentiate into multiple cell types, such as skeletal muscle, smooth muscle, and endothelial cells. Due to their limited fates, they would not be considered pluripotent stem cells, but they still provide a significant number of differentiation paths that can be used for a wide variety of applications. Along with their multipotency, mesoangioblasts have the ability to self-renew, like other stem cells, meaning that they can divide and create new copies of themselves. This allows them to maintain a population of stem cells that can differentiate into the aforementioned cell types.

Mesoangioblasts were identified based on their unique cell surface marker profile, which includes the expression of endothelial cell markers like KDR and angiopoietic cell markers like FLK1. Mesoangioblasts can differentiate into multiple cell types, including skeletal muscle, smooth muscle, endothelial cells, and cardiac cells. Mesoangioblast-derived skeletal and cardiac muscle cells expressed TNNT2 and TNNI3, while endothelial cells expressed CD31 and Ve-cadherin, and smooth muscle cells expressed aSMA and smMHC. They are also characterized by their ability to migrate and integrate into damaged tissues and their capabilities of self-renewal, which allows them to maintain their stem cell properties over multiple passages.

== Research and applications ==
=== Muscular Dystrophy ===
Due to their ability to differentiate into skeletal muscle cells, mesoangioblasts were tested as forms of stem cell therapy to regenerate skeletal muscle in animal models of Duchenne muscular dystrophy (DMD) and limb-girdle muscular dystrophy (LGMD). Experiments in alpha-sarcoglycan (α-SG) deficient dystrophic mice have shown that mesoangioblast transplantation can restore muscle function in a LGMD model. Cells from cloned embryonic dorsal aortas were delivered intra-arterially, where they migrated and engrafted to the dystrophic muscles, due to their expression of the receptor for advanced glycation end products. Embedding these cells was able to increase α-SG expression and reduce fibrosis and muscle damage. In conjunction with mesenchymal stem cells, mesoangioblasts can embed into dystrophic muscle fibers and provide reparative proteins such as dystrophin that replace the affected cells. In a 2006 study, mesoangioblast transplantation was used to ameliorate the effects of muscular dystrophy in Golden Retrievers with a congenital muscular dystrophy. The dogs given allogeneic cells survived; control animals died within 1 year.

=== Mitochondrial Myopathy ===
Research has also found that mesoangioblasts can be fused to myotubes that carry mitochondrial DNA (mtDNA) mutations to reduce these mutation loads in mitochondrial myopathy cases. Mesoangioblasts were found to show little mtDNA mutation loads in cases of mitochondrial myopathy, and their ability to go through the blood vessel wall, unlike satellite cells and myoblasts, allows them to be appropriate candidates for systemic myogenic stem cell therapy. To fuse myotubes to mesoangioblasts, female, mutant myotubes were combined with male wild-type mesoangioblasts to allow for FISH to be used to quantify Y-chromosome positive . A laser capture microdissection (LCM) protocol was developed to assess mtDNA mutation load, which resulted a proportional decrease in mutation load with the number of wild-type nuclei fusion into mutant myotubes. This experiment implies a potential stem cell therapy in muscles using mesoangioblasts, but mesoangioblast nuclei number needs to be optimized for further studies.

=== Cardiovascular Disease ===
Cardiac mesoangioblasts, which were derived from various regions in mouse juvenile hearts, can be used to differentiate into cardiomyocytes. Because cardiomyocytes lose the ability to divide after birth, if cells are damaged from disease, then the damage is irreparable, leading to heart failure and death. By treating adult cardiac mesoangioblasts with TGF-β, up to 30% of the cells could differentiate into smooth muscle cells, however most differentiate into cardiomyocytes. By coculturing cardiac mesoangioblasts with mouse neonatal cardiomyocytes, many mesoangioblasts differentiated into cardiomyocytes. These cardiomyocytes expressed connexin 43, myosin, actin, and α-actinin, which are markers of cardiomyocytes. Through the use of RT-PCR, skeletal actin was found to not be present, while cardiac actin was present. This solution allows for regeneration of cardiomyocytes that can be transplanted into the heart and replace damaged cells and restore function.
