= Arteriole =

Small arteries in the microcirculation

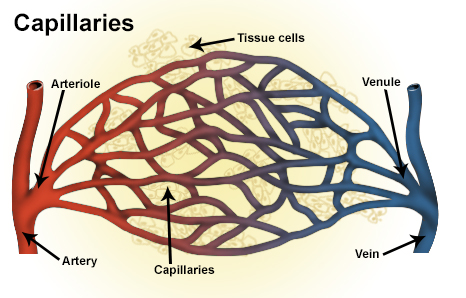
- Types of blood vessels, including an arteriole and artery, as well as capillaries.

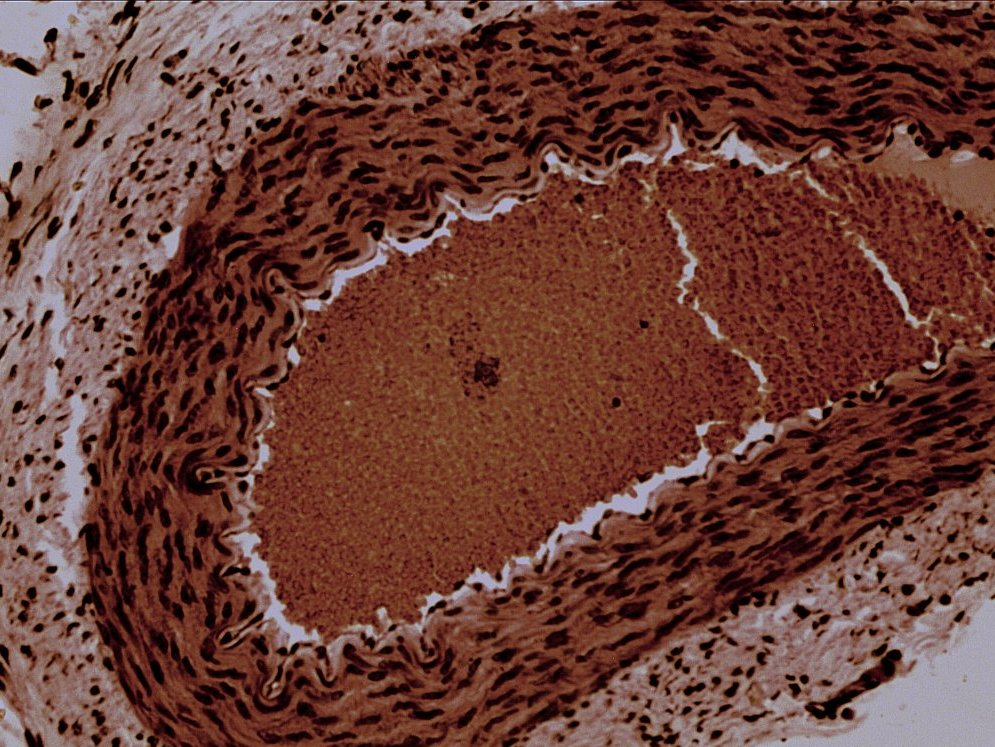
- Rabbit arteriole at 100X

Details
- Pronunciation: /ɑːrˈtɪəri.oʊl/

Identifiers
- Latin: arteriola
- MeSH: D001160
- TA98: A12.0.00.005
- TA2: 3900
- FMA: 63182

An arteriole is a small-diameter blood vessel in the microcirculation that extends and branches out from an artery and leads to capillaries.

Arterioles have muscular walls (usually only one to two layers of smooth muscle cells) and are the primary site of vascular resistance. The greatest change in blood pressure and velocity of blood flow occurs at the transition of arterioles to capillaries. This function is extremely important because it prevents the thin, one-layer capillaries from exploding upon pressure. The arterioles achieve this decrease in pressure, as they are the site with the highest resistance (a large contributor to total peripheral resistance) which translates to a large decrease in the pressure.

== Structure ==
In a healthy vascular system, the endothelium lines all blood-contacting surfaces, including arteries, arterioles, veins, venules, capillaries, and heart chambers. This healthy condition is promoted by the ample production of nitric oxide by the endothelium, which requires a biochemical reaction regulated by a complex balance of polyphenols, various nitric oxide synthase enzymes and L-arginine. In addition, there is direct electrical and chemical communication via gap junctions between the endothelial cells and the vascular smooth muscle.

== Physiology ==
=== Blood pressure ===
Blood pressure in the arteries supplying the body is a result of the work needed to pump the cardiac output (the flow of blood pumped by the heart) through the vascular resistance, sometimes termed total peripheral resistance. An increase in the tunica media to luminal diameter ratio has been observed in hypertensive arterioles (arteriolosclerosis) as the vascular wall thickens and/or luminal diameter decreases.

The up and down fluctuation of the arterial blood pressure is due to the pulsatile nature of the cardiac output and determined by the interaction of the stroke volume versus the volume and elasticity of the major arteries.

The decreased velocity of flow in the capillaries increases the blood pressure, due to Bernoulli's principle. This induces gas and nutrients to move from the blood to the cells, due to the lower osmotic pressure outside the capillary. The opposite process occurs when the blood leaves the capillaries and enters the venules, where the blood pressure drops due to an increase in flow rate. Arterioles receive autonomic nervous system innervation and respond to various circulating hormones in order to regulate their diameter. Retinal vessels lack a functional sympathetic innervation.

=== Autoregulation ===
Arteriole diameter varies according to autoregulation of organs or tissues to maintain sufficient blood flow despite changes in pressure via metabolic or myogenic factors which include stretch, carbon dioxide, and oxygen among other factors. Generally, norepinephrine and epinephrine (hormones produced by sympathetic nerves and the adrenal gland medulla) are vasoconstrictive acting on alpha 1-adrenergic receptors. However, the arterioles of skeletal muscle, cardiac muscle, and pulmonary circulation vasodilate in response to these hormones when they act on beta-adrenergic receptors. Generally, stretch and high oxygen tension increase tone, and carbon dioxide and low pH promote vasodilation. Pulmonary arterioles are a noteworthy exception as they vasodilate in response to high oxygen. Brain arterioles are particularly sensitive to pH with reduced pH promoting vasodilation. A number of hormones influence arteriole tone such as angiotensin II (vasoconstrictive), endothelin (vasoconstrictive), bradykinin (vasodilation), atrial natriuretic peptide (vasodilation), and prostacyclin (vasodilation).

== Clinical significance ==
Arteriole diameters decrease with age and with exposure to air pollution.

=== Disease ===
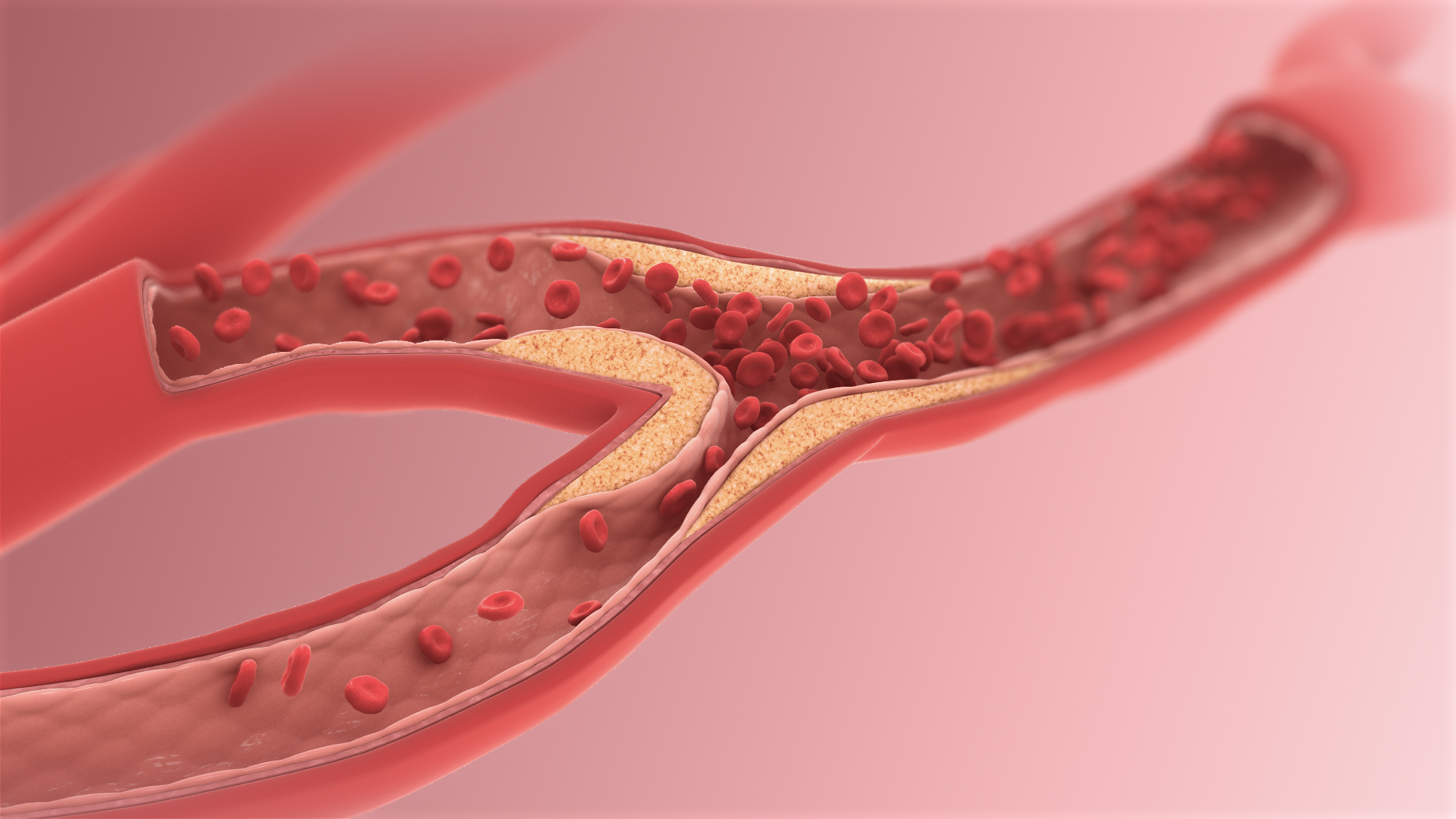
Decreased diameter of arteriole.

Any pathology which constricts blood flow, such as stenosis, will increase total peripheral resistance and lead to hypertension.

==== Arteriosclerosis ====
Arteriolosclerosis is the term specifically used for the hardening of arteriole walls. This can be due to decreased elastic production from fibrinogen, associated with ageing, or hypertension or pathological conditions such as atherosclerosis.

==== Arteritis ====
Arteritis of the arterioles occurs when the arteriole walls become inflamed as a result of either an immune response to infection or an autoimmune response.

=== Medication ===
The muscular contraction of arterioles is targeted by drugs that lower blood pressure (antihypertensives), for example the dihydropyridines (nifedipine and nicardipine), which block the calcium conductance in the muscular layer of the arterioles, causing relaxation.

This decreases the resistance to flow into peripheral vascular beds, lowering overall systemic pressure.

== Metarterioles ==
A "metarteriole" is an arteriole which bypasses capillary circulation.

== See also ==
- Surface chemistry of microvasculature
- Venule
- Microcirculation
