= Supine hypertension =

- Specialty: Cardiology, Neurology
- Symptoms: Elevated blood pressure when lying down
- Complications: Cardiovascular strain, risk of stroke
- Causes: Autonomic dysfunction; medications such as Midodrine and Droxidopa
- Differential diagnosis: Orthostatic hypotension
- Treatment: Medication adjustment, positional therapy
- Frequency: Rare

Supine hypertension is a paradoxical elevation in blood pressure upon assuming a supine position from a standing or sitting position. It is assumed to be a manifestation of disorders of the autonomic nervous system or due to side effects of medications such as midodrine and droxidopa.
