= Vascular smooth muscle =

Smooth muscle tissue in the walls of blood vessels

- Diagram showing the location of vascular smooth muscle cells

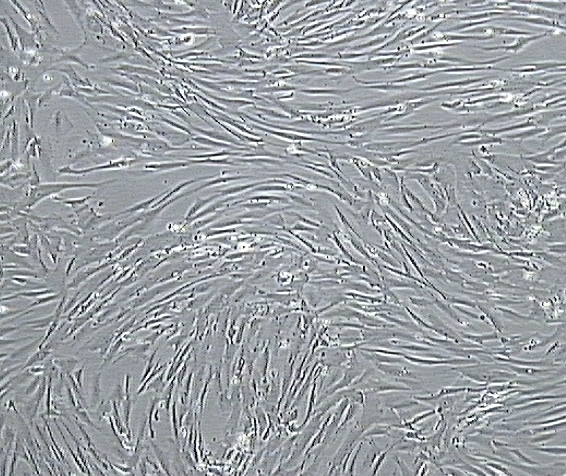
- Vascular smooth muscle cells, isolated from human aorta, growing and forming a monolayer in cell culture

Details
- Part of: smooth muscle wall of blood vessels

Identifiers
- MeSH: D009131

Vascular smooth muscle is the type of smooth muscle found in the walls of blood vessels.

== Structure ==
Vascular smooth muscle refers to the particular type of smooth muscle found within the walls of blood vessels. In some types of blood vessels, it comprises much of the walls, but others (like capillaries) have no smooth muscle.

=== Nerve supply ===
Vascular smooth muscle is innervated primarily by the sympathetic nervous system through three types of adrenergic receptors (adrenoceptors): alpha-1, alpha-2 and beta-2 adrenergic receptors. The main endogenous agonist of these cell receptors is norepinephrine (NE).

The adrenergic receptors exert opposite physiologic effects in the vascular smooth muscle under activation:

- alpha-1 receptors. Under NE binding alpha-1 receptors cause vasoconstriction (contraction of the vascular smooth muscle cells decreasing the diameter of the vessels). These receptors are activated in response to shock or low blood pressure as a defensive reaction trying to restore the normal blood pressure. Antagonists of alpha-1 receptors (doxazosin, prazosin) cause vasodilation (a decrease in vascular smooth muscle tone with increase of vessel diameter and decrease of the blood pressure). (See also receptor antagonist)
- alpha-2 receptors. Agonists of alpha-2 receptors in the vascular smooth muscle lead to vasoconstriction. However, in clinical practice drugs applied intravenously that are agonists of alpha-2 receptors such as clonidine lead to powerful vasodilation, which causes a decrease in blood pressure by presynaptic activation of the receptors in the sympathetic ganglia. This presynaptic effect is predominant and completely overrides the vasoconstrictive effect of the alpha-2 receptors in the vascular smooth muscle.
- beta-2 receptors. Agonism of beta-2 receptors causes vasodilation and low blood pressure (i.e. the effect is opposite of the one resulting from activation of alpha-1 and alpha-2 receptors in the vascular smooth muscle cells). Usage of beta-2 receptor agonists as hypotensive agents is less widespread due to adverse effects such as unnecessary bronchodilation in lungs and increase in blood sugar levels.

== Function ==
Vascular smooth muscle contracts or relaxes to change both the volume of blood vessels and the local blood pressure, a mechanism that is responsible for the redistribution of the blood within the body to areas where it is needed (i.e. areas with temporarily enhanced oxygen consumption). Thus the main function of vascular smooth muscle tone is to regulate the caliber of the blood vessels in the body. Excessive vasoconstriction leads to high blood pressure, while excessive vasodilation as in shock leads to low blood pressure. Vascular smooth muscle cells also play important roles during development, e.g. driving osteocyte differentiation from undifferentiated precursors during osteogenesis.

Arteries have a great deal more smooth muscle within their walls than veins, thus their greater wall thickness. This is because they have to carry pumped blood away from the heart to all the organs and tissues that need the oxygenated blood. The endothelial lining of each is similar.

Excessive proliferation of vascular smooth muscle cells contributes to the progression of pathological conditions, such as vascular inflammation, plaque formation, atherosclerosis, restenosis, and pulmonary hypertension. Recent studies have shown that the majority of cells within atherosclerotic plaque, the predominant cause of heart attack and stroke, are vascular smooth muscle cell derived.

== See also ==
- Mural cell
