= Vascular recruitment =

Vascular recruitment is the increase in the number of perfused capillaries in response to a stimulus. I.e., the more you exercise regularly, the more oxygen can reach your muscles.

Vascular recruitment may also be called capillary recruitment.

== Vascular recruitment in skeletal muscle ==
The term «vascular recruitment» or «capillary recruitment» usually refers to the increase in the number perfused capillaries in skeletal muscle in response to a stimulus. The most important stimulus in humans is regular exercise. Vascular recruitment in skeletal muscle is thought to enhance the capillary surface area for oxygen exchange and decrease the oxygen diffusion distance.

Other stimuli are possible. Insulin can act as a stimulus for vascular recruitment in skeletal muscle. This process may also improve glucose delivery to skeletal muscle by increasing the surface area for diffusion. That insulin can act in this way has been proposed based on increases in limb blood flow and skeletal muscle blood volume which occurred after hyperinsulinemia.

The exact extent of capillary recruitment in intact skeletal muscle in response to regular exercise or insulin is unknown, because non-invasive measurement techniques are not yet extremely precise.

Being overweight or obese may negatively interfere with vascular recruitment in skeletal muscle.

== Vascular recruitment in the lung ==
Vascular recruitment in the lung (i.e., in the pulmonary microcirculation) may be noteworthy to healthcare professionals in emergency medicine, because it may increase evidence of lung injury, and increase pulmonary capillary protein leak.

== Vascular recruitment in the brain ==
Vascular recruitment in the brain is thought to lead to new capillaries and increase the cerebral blood flow.

== Controversy ==
The existence of vascular recruitment in response to a stimulus has been disputed by some researchers. However, most researchers accept that vascular recruitment exists.
