= Microcirculation =

Circulation of the blood in the smallest blood vessels

- Microcirculation in the capillary

Details
- System: Circulatory system
- Artery: Arteriole
- Vein: Venule

Identifiers
- MeSH: D008833

The microcirculation is the circulation of the blood in the smallest blood vessels, the microvessels of the microvasculature present within organ tissues. The microvessels include terminal arterioles, metarterioles, capillaries, and venules. Arterioles carry oxygenated blood to the capillaries, and blood flows out of the capillaries through venules into veins.

In addition to these blood vessels, the microcirculation also includes lymphatic capillaries and collecting ducts. The main functions of the microcirculation are the delivery of oxygen and nutrients and the removal of carbon dioxide (CO_{2}). It also serves to regulate blood flow and tissue perfusion, thereby affecting blood pressure and responses to inflammation which can include edema (swelling).

Most vessels of the microcirculation are lined by flattened cells of the endothelium and many of them are surrounded by contractile cells called pericytes. The endothelium provides a smooth surface for the flow of blood and regulates the movement of water and dissolved materials in the interstitial plasma between the blood and the tissues. The vascular endothelium also plays an important regulatory role in microcirculatory function. Endothelial cells respond to biochemical and mechanical stimuli and regulate vascular tone through the release of vasoactive mediators such as nitric oxide, prostacyclin, and endothelin.

The microcirculation contrasts with macrocirculation, which is the circulation of blood to and from the organs.

== Structure ==
=== Microvessels ===
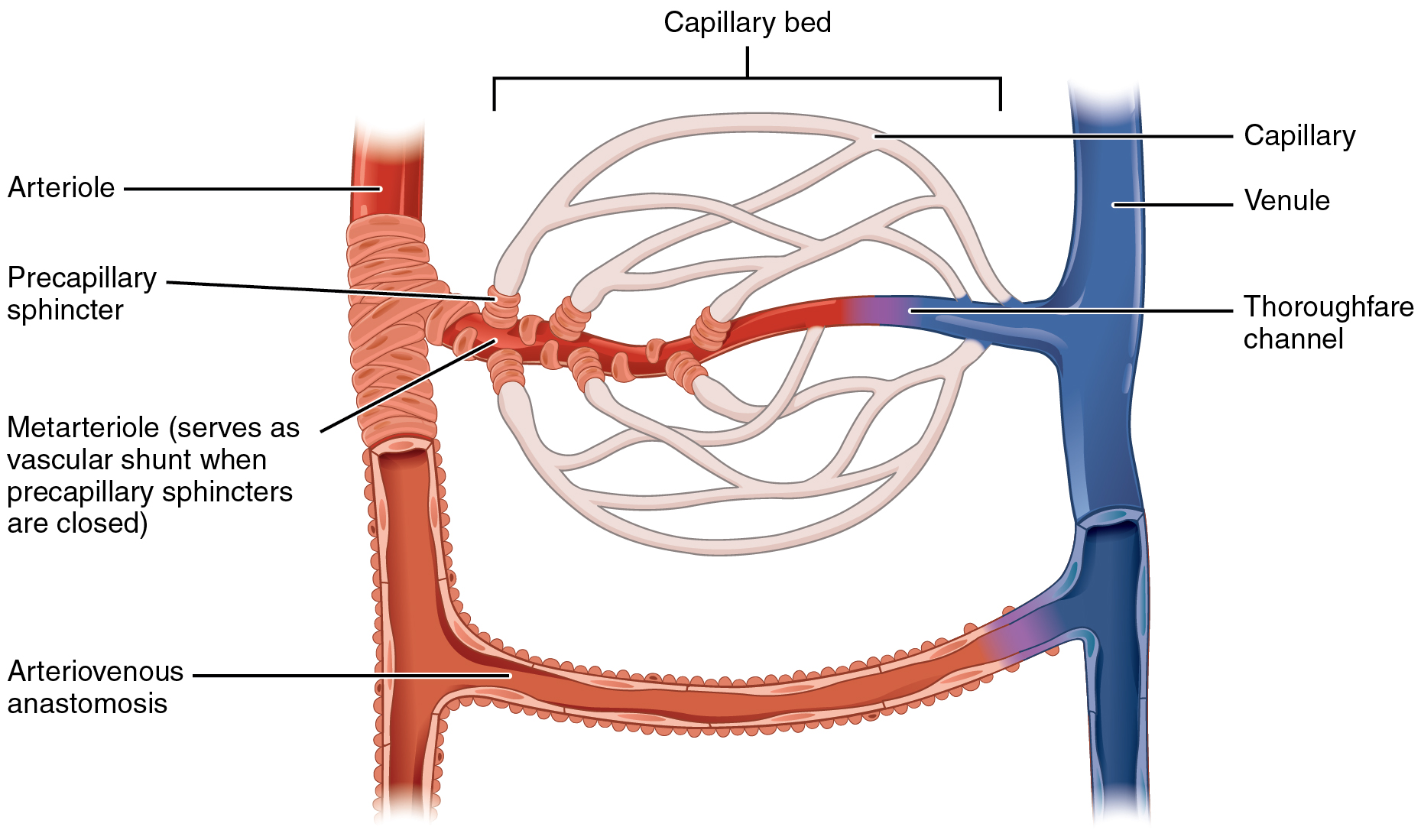
Blood flows away from the heart to arteries, which follow into arterioles, and then narrow further into capillaries. After the tissue has been perfused, capillaries branch and widen to become venules and then widen more and connect to become veins, which return blood to the heart.

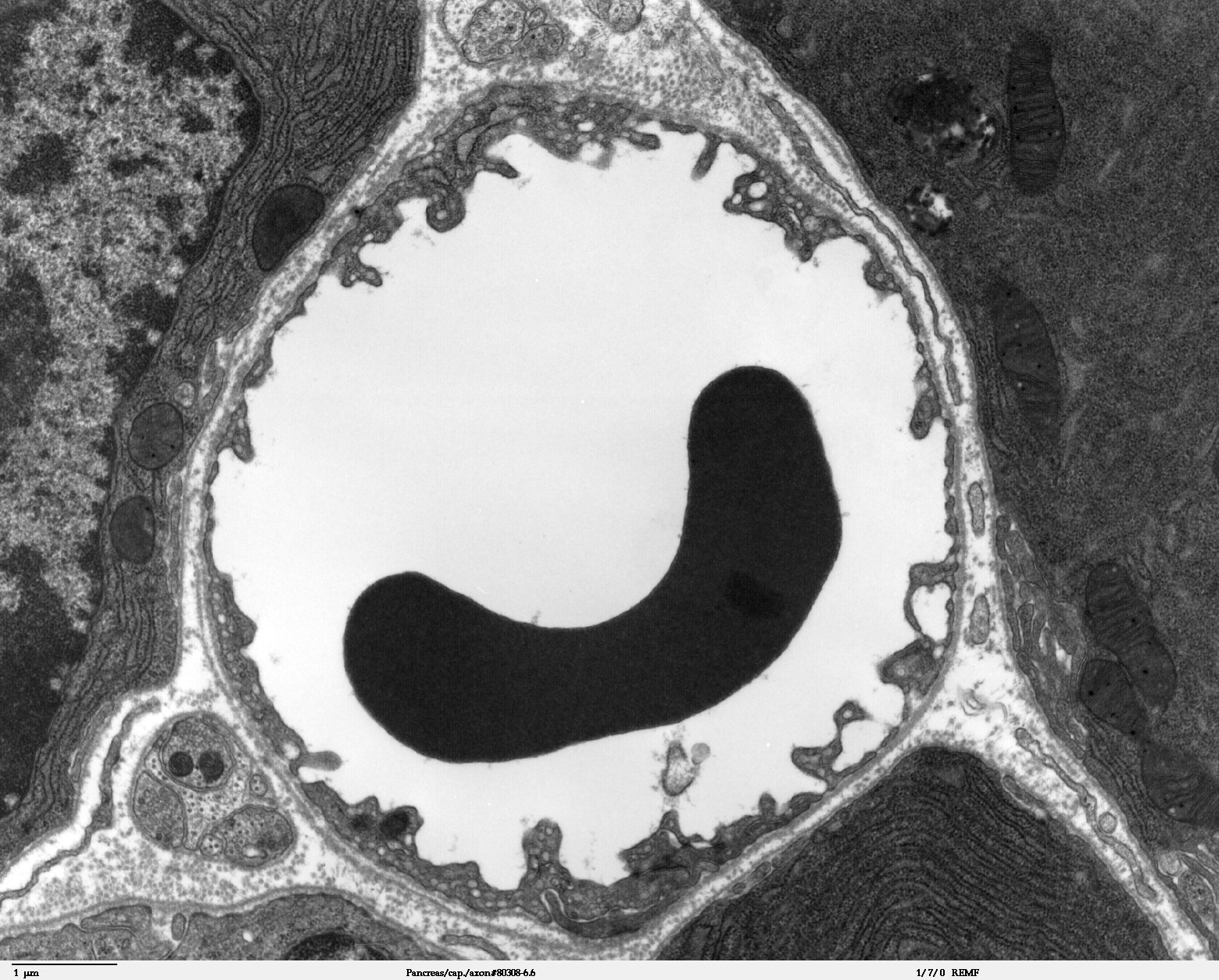
Transmission electron microscope image of a capillary with a red blood cell within the pancreas. The capillary lining consists of long, thin endothelial cells, connected by tight junctions.

The vessels on the arterial side of the microcirculation are called the arterioles, which are well innervated, are surrounded by smooth muscle cells, and are 10-50 μm in diameter. Arterioles carry the blood to the capillaries, which are not innervated, have no smooth muscle, and are about 5–8 μm in diameter. Blood flows out of the capillaries into the venules, which have little smooth muscle and are 10–200 μm. The blood flows from the venules into the veins. Metarterioles connect arterioles and capillaries. A tributary to the venules is known as a thoroughfare channel.

The microcirculation has three major components: pre-capillary, capillary, and post-capillary. In the pre-capillary sector, arterioles, and precapillary sphincters participate. Their function is to regulate blood flow before it enters the capillaries and venules by the contraction and relaxation of the smooth muscle found on their walls. The second sector is the capillary sector, which is represented by the capillaries, where substance and gas exchange between blood and interstitial fluid takes place. Finally, the post-capillary sector is represented by the post-capillary venules, which are formed by a layer of endothelial cells that allow free movement of some substances.

=== Microanatomy ===
Most vessels of the microcirculation are lined by flattened cells of the endothelium and many of them are surrounded by contractile cells called pericytes. The endothelium provides a smooth surface for the flow of blood and regulates the movement of water and dissolved materials in the interstitial plasma between the blood and the tissues. The endothelium also produces molecules that discourage the blood from clotting unless there is a leak. Pericyte cells can contract and decrease the size of the arterioles and thereby regulate blood flow and blood pressure.

== Function ==
In addition to these blood vessels, the microcirculation also includes lymphatic capillaries and collecting ducts. The main functions of the microcirculation are the delivery of oxygen and nutrients and the removal of carbon dioxide (CO_{2}). It also serves to regulate blood flow and tissue perfusion thereby affecting blood pressure and responses to inflammation which can include edema (swelling).

=== Regulation ===
The regulation of tissue perfusion occurs in microcirculation. There, arterioles control the flow of blood to the capillaries. Arterioles contract and relax, varying their diameter and vascular tone, as the vascular smooth muscle responds to diverse stimuli. Distension of the vessels due to increased blood pressure is a fundamental stimulus for muscle contraction in arteriolar walls. As a consequence, microcirculation blood flow remains constant despite changes in systemic blood pressure. This mechanism is present in all tissues and organs of the human body. In addition, the nervous system participates in the regulation of microcirculation. The sympathetic nervous system activates the smaller arterioles, including terminals. Noradrenaline and adrenaline have effects on alpha and beta adrenergic receptors. Other hormones (catecholamine, renin-angiotensin, vasopressin, and atrial natriuretic peptide) circulate in the bloodstream and can have an effect on the microcirculation causing vasodilation or vasoconstriction. Many hormones and neuropeptides are released together with classical neurotransmitters.

Arterioles respond to metabolic stimuli that are generated in the tissues. When tissue metabolism increases, catabolic products accumulate leading to vasodilation. The endothelium begins to control muscle tone and arteriolar blood flow tissue. Endothelial function in the circulation includes the activation and inactivation of circulating hormones and other plasma constituents. There are also synthesis and secretion of vasodilator and vasoconstrictor substances for modifying the width as necessary. Variations in the flow of blood that circulates by arterioles are capable of responses in endothelium. In addition to biochemical signals, mechanical forces generated by blood flow influence endothelial function. These forces, known as shear stress, are sensed by endothelial cells and converted into biochemical signals in a process known as mechanotransduction. Shear stress plays an important role in the regulation of nitric oxide production and microvascular perfusion.

== Microvascular dysfunction ==
Microvascular dysfunction refers to structural or functional abnormalities of the microcirculation that impair tissue perfusion. It may result from endothelial dysfunction, altered vascular tone, or structural changes in the microvascular network.

Microvascular dysfunction has been associated with several diseases including diabetes mellitus, sepsis, cardiovascular disease and chronic inflammatory disorders.

=== Capillary exchange ===
The term capillary exchange refers to all exchanges at microcirculatory level, most of which occurs in the capillaries. Sites where material exchange occurs between the blood and tissues are the capillaries, which branch out to increase the swap area, minimize the diffusion distance as well as maximize the surface area and the exchange time.

Approximately, seven percent of the body's blood is in the capillaries which continuously exchange substances with the liquid outside these blood vessels, called interstitial fluid. This dynamic displacement of materials between the interstitial fluid and the blood is named capillary exchange. These substances pass through capillaries through three different systems or mechanisms: diffusion, bulk flow, and transcytosis or vesicular transport. The liquid and solid exchanges that take place in the microvasculature particularly involve capillaries and post-capillary venules and collecting venules.

Capillary walls allow the free flow of almost every substance in plasma. The plasma proteins are the only exception, as they are too big to pass through. The minimum number of un-absorbable plasma proteins that exit capillaries enters lymphatic circulation for returning later on to those blood vessels. Those proteins which leave capillaries use the first capillary exchange mechanism and the process of diffusion, which is caused by kinetic motion of molecules.

==== Regulation of capillary exchange ====
These exchanges of substances are regulated by different mechanisms. These mechanisms work together and promote capillary exchange in the following way. First, molecules that diffuse are going to travel a short distance thanks to the capillary wall, the small diameter and the close proximity to each cell having a capillary. The short distance is important because the capillary diffusion rate decreases when the diffusion distance increases. Then, because of its large number (10–14 million capillaries), there is an incredible amount of surface area for exchange. However, this only has 5% of the total blood volume (250 ml/5000 ml). Finally, blood flows more slowly in the capillaries, given the extensive branching.

== Microcirculation and aging ==
Aging is associated with structural and functional alterations of the microcirculation, including reduced capillary density, impaired endothelial function and decreased nitric oxide bioavailability. These changes may contribute to reduced tissue perfusion and have been implicated in the development of cardiovascular and metabolic diseases.

=== Diffusion ===
Diffusion is the first and most important mechanism that allows the flow of small molecules across capillaries. The process depends on the difference of gradients between the interstitium and blood, with molecules moving to low concentrated spaces from high concentrated ones. Glucose, amino acids, oxygen (O_{2}) and other molecules exit capillaries by diffusion to reach the organism's tissues. Contrarily, carbon dioxide (CO_{2}) and other wastes leave tissues and enter capillaries by the same process but in reverse. Diffusion through the capillary walls depends on the permeability of the endothelial cells forming the capillary walls, which may be continuous, discontinuous, and fenestrated. The Starling equation describes the roles of hydrostatic and osmotic pressures (the so-called Starling forces) in the movement of fluid across capillary endothelium. Lipids, which are transported by proteins, are too large to cross the capillary walls by diffusion, and have to rely on the other two methods.

=== Bulk flow ===
The second mechanism of capillary exchange is bulk flow. It is used by small, lipid-insoluble substances in order to cross. This movement depends on the physical characteristics of the capillaries. For example, continuous capillaries (tight structure) reduce bulk flow, fenestrated capillaries (perforated structure) increases bulk flow, and discontinuous capillaries (great intercellular gaps) enable bulk flow. In this case, the exchange of materials is determined by changes in pressure. When the flow of substances goes from the bloodstream or the capillary to the interstitial space or interstitium, the process is called filtration. Filtration occurs mainly on the arteriolar side of capillaries. This kind of movement is favored by blood hydrostatic pressure (BHP) and interstitial fluid osmotic pressure (IFOP). When substances move from the interstitial fluid to the blood in capillaries, the process is called reabsorption. Reabsorption occurs mainly on the venular side of the capillaries. The pressures that favor this movement are blood colloid osmotic pressure (BCOP) and interstitial fluid hydrostatic pressure (IFHP). Whether a substance is filtrated or reabsorbed depends on the net filtration pressure (NFP), which is the difference between hydrostatic (BHP and IFHP) and osmotic pressures (IFOP and BCOP). These pressures are known as the Starling forces. The Starling Principle describes how these pressures relate in order to influence fluid movements between blood and tissues. If the NFP is positive then there will be filtration, but if it is negative then reabsorption will occur.

=== Transcytosis ===
The third capillary exchange mechanism is transcytosis, also called vesicular transport. By this process, blood substances move across the endothelial cells that compose the capillary structure. Finally, these materials exit by exocytosis, the process by which vesicles go out from a cell to the interstitial space. Few substances cross by transcytosis: it is mainly used by large, lipid-insoluble molecules such as the insulin hormone. Once vesicles exit the capillaries, they go to the interstitium. Vesicles can go directly to a specific tissue or they can merge with other vesicles, so their contents are mixed. This intermixed material increases the functional capability of the vesicle.

== Assessment of the microcirculation ==
Several techniques have been developed to assess microcirculatory function in research and clinical settings. These include intravital microscopy, Laser Doppler flowmetry, laser speckle contrast imaging, transcutaneous oxygen measurements and handheld video microscopy. These methods allow investigators to evaluate tissue perfusion and microvascular blood flow and are increasingly used in critical care medicine and vascular research.

== See also ==
- Fahraeus–Lindquist effect
- Glycocalyx
- Microcirculatory Society
