= Vasomotion =

Spontaneous oscillation in tone of blood vessel walls

Vasomotion is the spontaneous oscillation in tone of blood vessel walls, independent of heart beat, innervation or respiration. While vasomotion was first observed by Thomas Wharton Jones in 1852, the complete mechanisms responsible for its generation and its physiological importance remain to be elucidated. However, several hypotheses have been put forth.

== Mechanism ==
Intracellular calcium (Ca^{2+}) concentration exhibits periodic oscillations in vascular smooth muscle cells. This is thought to result from Ca^{2+} release from intracellular stores, due to inositol triphosphate and ryanodine-sensitive channel activation. This activation has been shown to result in either Ca^{2+} "sparks", highly localized calcium increases, or "waves", global Ca^{2+} increase that propagates the length of the cell.

To allow vasomotion to occur, synchronization must occur between the individual oscillations, resulting in global calcium synchronization and vessel tone oscillation. Gap junctions are thought to play a large role in this synchronization, as application of gap junction blockers has been shown to abolish vasomotion, indicating a critical role. Due to regional variations in gap junction distribution and coupling (homocellular vs. heterocellular) several hypotheses have been suggested to account for vasomotion occurrence.

The "classic" mechanism of vasomotion generation is thought to be the voltage-dependent coupled model. In this model, high gap junction coupling is present between the vascular smooth muscle cells, the endothelial cells and the endothelial to vascular smooth muscle cells. An initial depolarizing current leads to the opening of the voltage-dependent calcium channels, ultimately resulting in synchronization of individual calcium levels. When patch clamp recordings are conducted, depolarization occurs in the endothelial layer at the same time as the underlying vascular smooth muscle. The cause of the initial depolarizing current, however, remains to be determined. Mathematical modeling has pointed to the existence of 2-4 independent non-linear oscillating systems interacting to produce vasomotion. It is possible that in order for vasomotion to be generated, these systems must pass a depolarizing threshold.

== Physiological role ==
Several possible hypotheses have been advanced to explain vasomotion. Increased flow is one possibility; mathematical modeling has shown a vessel with an oscillating diameter to conduct more flow than a vessel with a static diameter. Vasomotion could also be a mechanism of increasing the reactivity of a blood vessel by avoiding the "latch state", a low ATP cycling state of prolonged force generation common in vascular smooth muscle. Finally, vasomotion has been shown to be altered in a variety of pathological situations, with vessels from both hypertensive and diabetic patients displaying altered flow patterns as compared to normotensive vessels.

== See also ==
- Vasoconstriction
- Vasodilation
- Vasospasm
