= Fluid compartments =

Conceptual divisions of a living body

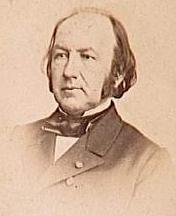
Claude Bernard, French physician who introduced the concept of homeostasis

The human body and even its individual body fluids may be conceptually divided into various fluid compartments, which, although not literally anatomic compartments, do represent a real division in terms of how portions of the body's water, solutes, and suspended elements are segregated. The two main fluid compartments are the intracellular and extracellular compartments. The intracellular compartment is the space within the organism's cells; it is separated from the extracellular compartment by cell membranes.

About two-thirds of the total body water of humans is held in the cells, mostly in the cytosol, and the remainder is found in the extracellular compartment. The extracellular fluids may be divided into three types: interstitial fluid in the "interstitial compartment" (surrounding tissue cells and bathing them in a solution of nutrients and other chemicals), blood plasma and lymph in the "intravascular compartment" (inside the blood vessels and lymphatic vessels), and small amounts of transcellular fluid such as ocular and cerebrospinal fluids in the "transcellular compartment".

The normal processes by which life self-regulates its biochemistry (homeostasis) produce fluid balance across the fluid compartments. Water and electrolytes are continuously moving across barriers (e.g., cell membranes, vessel walls), albeit often in small amounts, to maintain this healthy balance. The movement of these molecules is controlled and restricted by various mechanisms. When illnesses upset the balance, electrolyte imbalances can result.

The interstitial and intravascular compartments readily exchange water and solutes, but the third extracellular compartment, the transcellular, is thought of as separate from the other two and not in dynamic equilibrium with them.

The science of fluid balance across fluid compartments has practical application in intravenous therapy, where doctors and nurses must predict fluid shifts and decide which IV fluids to give (for example, isotonic versus hypotonic), how much to give, and how fast (volume or mass per minute or hour).

== Intracellular compartment ==
The intracellular fluid (ICF) is all fluids contained inside the cells, which consists of cytosol and fluid in the cell nucleus. The cytosol is the matrix in which cellular organelles are suspended. The cytosol and organelles together compose the cytoplasm. The cell membranes are the outer barrier. In humans, the intracellular compartment contains on average about 28 liters (6.2 imp gal; 7.4 U.S. gal) of fluid, and under ordinary circumstances remains in osmotic equilibrium. It contains moderate quantities of magnesium and sulfate ions.

In the cell nucleus, the fluid component of the nucleoplasm is called the nucleosol.

== Extracellular compartment ==
The interstitial, intravascular and transcellular compartments comprise the extracellular compartment. Its extracellular fluid (ECF) contains about one-third of total body water.

=== Intravascular compartment ===
The main intravascular fluid in mammals is blood, a complex mixture with elements of a suspension (blood cells), colloid (globulins), and solutes (glucose and ions). The blood represents both the intracellular compartment (the fluid inside the blood cells) and the extracellular compartment (the blood plasma). The average volume of plasma in the average (70-kilogram or 150-pound) male is approximately 3.5 liters (0.77 imp gal; 0.92 U.S. gal). The volume of the intravascular compartment is regulated in part by hydrostatic pressure gradients, and by reabsorption by the kidneys.

=== Interstitial compartment ===
The interstitial compartment (also called "tissue space") surrounds tissue cells. It is filled with interstitial fluid, including lymph. Interstitial fluid provides the immediate microenvironment that allows for movement of ions, proteins and nutrients across the cell barrier. This fluid is not static, but is continually being refreshed by the blood capillaries and recollected by lymphatic capillaries. In the average male (70-kilogram or 150-pound) human body, the interstitial space has approximately 10.5 liters (2.3 imp gal; 2.8 U.S. gal) of fluid.

=== Transcellular compartment ===
The transcellular fluid is the portion of total body fluid that is formed by the secretory activity of epithelial cells and is contained within specialized epithelial-lined compartments. Fluid does not normally collect in larger amounts in these spaces, and any significant fluid collection in these spaces is physiologically nonfunctional. Examples of transcellular spaces include the eye, the central nervous system (CNS), the peritoneal and pleural cavities, and the joint capsules. A small amount of fluid, called transcellular fluid, does exist normally in such spaces. For example, the aqueous humor, the vitreous humor, the cerebrospinal fluid, the serous fluid produced by the serous membranes, and the synovial fluid produced by the synovial membranes are all transcellular fluids. They are all very important, yet there is not much of each. For example, there is only about 150 milliliters (5.3 imp fl oz; 5.1 U.S. fl oz) of cerebrospinal fluid in the entire CNS at any moment. All of the above-mentioned fluids are produced by active cellular processes working with blood plasma as the raw material, and they are all more or less similar to blood plasma except for certain modifications tailored to their function. For example, the cerebrospinal fluid is made by various cells of the CNS, mostly the ependymal cells, from blood plasma.

== Fluid shift ==
Fluid shifts occur when the body's fluids move between the fluid compartments. Physiologically, this occurs by a combination of hydrostatic pressure gradients and osmotic pressure gradients. Water will move from one space into the next passively across a semi permeable membrane until the hydrostatic and osmotic pressure gradients balance each other. Many medical conditions can cause fluid shifts. When fluid moves out of the intravascular compartment (the blood vessels), blood pressure can drop to dangerously low levels, endangering critical organs such as the brain, heart and kidneys; when it shifts out of the cells (the intracellular compartment), cellular processes slow down or cease from intracellular dehydration; when excessive fluid accumulates in the interstitial space, oedema develops; and fluid shifts into the brain cells can cause increased cranial pressure. Fluid shifts may be compensated by fluid replacement or diuretics.

=== Third spacing ===
"Third spacing" is the abnormal accumulation of fluid into an extracellular and extravascular space. In medicine, the term is often used with regard to loss of fluid into interstitial spaces, such as with burns or edema, but it can also refer to fluid shifts into a body cavity (transcellular space), such as ascites and pleural effusions. With regard to severe burns, fluids may pool on the burn site (i.e. fluid lying outside of the interstitial tissue, exposed to evaporation) and cause depletion of the fluids. With pancreatitis or ileus, fluids may "leak out" into the peritoneal cavity, also causing depletion of the intracellular, interstitial or vascular compartments.

Patients who undergo long, difficult operations in large surgical fields can collect third-space fluids and become intravascularly depleted despite large volumes of intravenous fluid and blood replacement.

The precise volume of fluid in a patient's third spaces changes over time and is difficult to accurately quantify.

Third spacing conditions may include peritonitis, pyometritis, and pleural effusions. Hydrocephalus and glaucoma are theoretically forms of third spacing, but the volumes are too small to induce significant shifts in blood volumes, or overall body volumes, and thus are generally not referred to as third spacing.

== See also ==
- Blood–brain barrier
- Compartment (pharmacokinetics)
- Distribution (pharmacology) and volume of distribution
