= Onset of action =

Duration of time between drug administration and effect

Onset of action is the duration of time it takes for a drug's effects to come to prominence upon administration. With oral administration, it typically ranges anywhere from 20 minutes to over an hour, depending on the drug in question. Other methods of ingestion such as smoking or injection can take as little as seconds to minutes to take effect. The determination of the onset of action, however, is not completely dependent upon route of administration. There are several other factors that determine the onset of action for a specific drug, including drug formulation, dosage, and the patient receiving the drug.

== Effect of Administration Route on the Onset of Action ==
A drug's pharmacological effects can only occur once it has been fully solubilized and has entered the blood stream. For most drugs administered orally, the drug must be ingested, pass through the stomach, and into the small intestine, where the drug molecules enter the blood stream through the villi and microvilli. A few drugs such as alcohol are absorbed by the lining of the stomach, and therefore tend to take effect much more quickly than the vast majority of oral medications which are absorbed in the small intestine. Gastric emptying time can vary from 0 to 3 hours, and therefore plays a major role in onset of action for orally administered drugs. For intravenous administration, the pathway is much shorter because the drug is administered (usually already in solution) directly to the bloodstream.
