= The Pee Pocket =

Urination device

The Pee Pocket is a single-use urinary device that allows a person to stand while urinating, in situations where they could not normally do so.

It was developed by a team of doctors and it is marketed primarily to women, athletes, travelers, the elderly, disabled, pregnancy, parents of young girls, and post-surgery patients. It can also be used to prevent the exchange of bodily fluids between people through contact with unsanitary surfaces. In 2014, when media reported an increase of Ebola cases around the world, the Pee Pocket was said to help prevent the disease. The Pee Pocket has also become very popular in the LGBTQ community and is used in bathrooms worldwide.

The Pee Pocket® was developed by a team of doctors who were fed up with dirty and unsanitary public bathrooms for their families. These surgeons developed a single-use, disposable, biodegradable women’s standing urination device so that everyone can finally take a stand®, avoid un-sanitary conditions and the potential for skin infections.

The demand for The Pee Pocket® has been so great by patients that a larger 48-pack carton was developed for hospitals, clinics, acute and long-term care facilities. Elderly women, post-surgical patients, (hip, knee, etc.), pregnant women and men who have trouble squatting or bending down to pee have regained their independence to relieve themselves.
