= Compartment (pharmacokinetics) =

Defined volume of body fluids, typically of the human body

Estimated % of body mass
1. Blood plasma (5%)
2. Interstitial fluid (16%)
3. Fat tissue (20%)
4. Intracellular fluid (35%)
5. Transcellular fluid (2%)
6. Other or non-fluid (22%)

In pharmacokinetics, a compartment is a defined volume of body fluids, typically of the human body, but also those of other animals with multiple organ systems. The meaning in this area of study is different from the concept of anatomic compartments, which are bounded by fasciae, the sheath of fibrous tissue that enclose mammalian organs. Instead, the concept focuses on broad types of fluidic systems. This analysis is used in attempts to mathematically describe distribution of small molecules throughout organisms with multiple compartments. Various multi-compartment models can be used in the areas of pharmacokinetics and pharmacology, in the support of efforts in drug discovery, and in environmental science.

In humans and related organisms, there are five major body compartments: the blood plasma, interstitial fluids, fat tissues, intracellular fluids, and transcellular fluids, the latter of which includes fluids in the pleural (peritoneal) cavity. The relative percents of body mass of these are included in the pie chart above.

== See also ==
- Fluid compartments
