= Intestinal villus =

Finger-like projection of the small intestine

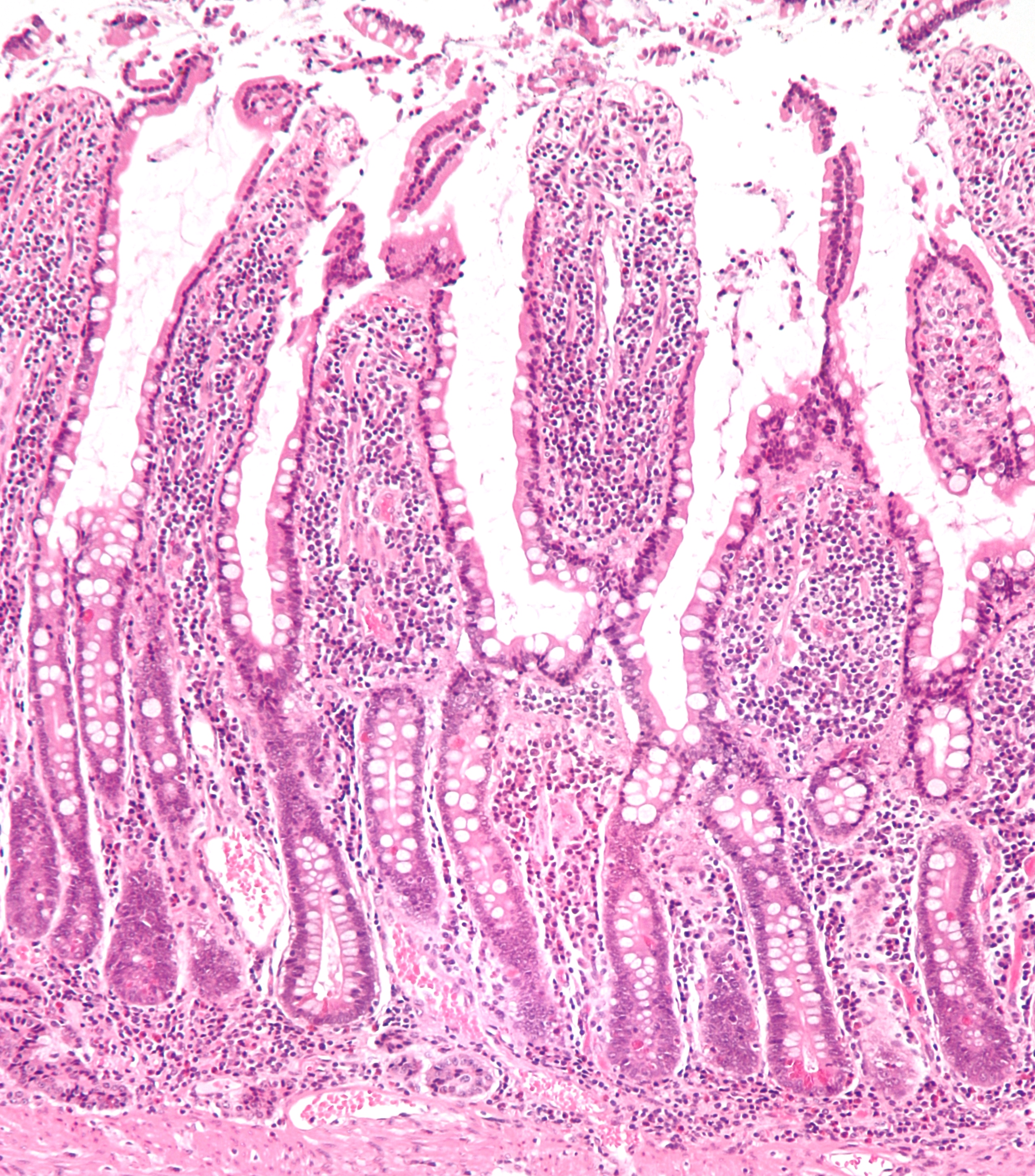
- Micrograph of the small intestine mucosa showing villi – top half of image. H&E stain

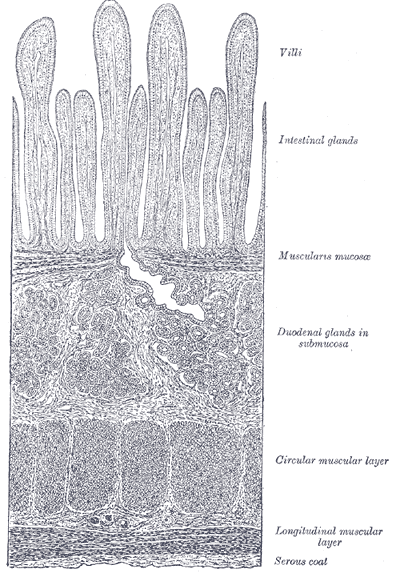
- Section of duodenum of a cat. X 60.

Details
- Part of: Wall of small intestine
- System: Digestive system

Identifiers
- Latin: villi intestinales
- TA98: A05.6.01.011
- TA2: 2941
- FMA: 15072 76464, 15072

Intestinal villi (sing.: villus) are small, finger-like projections that extend into the lumen of the small intestine and are also tissues. Each villus is approximately 0.5–1.6 mm in length (in humans), and has many microvilli projecting from the enterocytes of its epithelium which collectively form the striated or brush border. Each of these microvilli are about 1 μm in length, around 1000 times shorter than a single villus. The intestinal villi are much smaller than any of the circular folds in the intestine.

Villi increase the internal surface area of the intestinal walls making available a greater surface area for absorption. An increased absorptive area is useful because digested nutrients (including monosaccharide and amino acids) pass into the semipermeable villi through diffusion, which is effective only at short distances. In other words, increased surface area (in contact with the fluid in the lumen) decreases the average distance travelled by nutrient molecules, so effectiveness of diffusion increases. The villi are connected to the blood vessels so the circulating blood then carries these nutrients away.

== Structure ==
=== Microanatomy ===
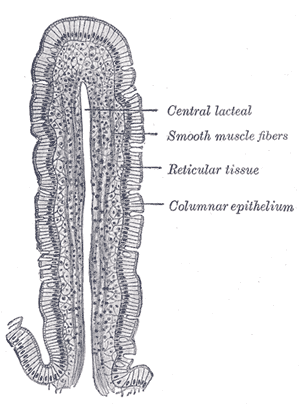
Vertical section of a villus from the dog's small intestine. X 80. (Simple columnar epithelium labeled at right, third from top.)

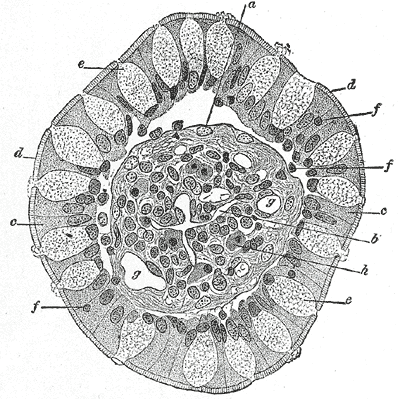
Transverse section of a villus, from the human intestine. X 350.
a. Basement membrane, here somewhat shrunken away from the epithelium.
b. Lacteal.
c. Columnar epithelium.
d. Its striated border.
e. Goblet cells.
f. Leucocytes in epithelium.
f’. Leucocytes below epbithelium.
g. Blood vessels.
h. Muscle cells cut across.

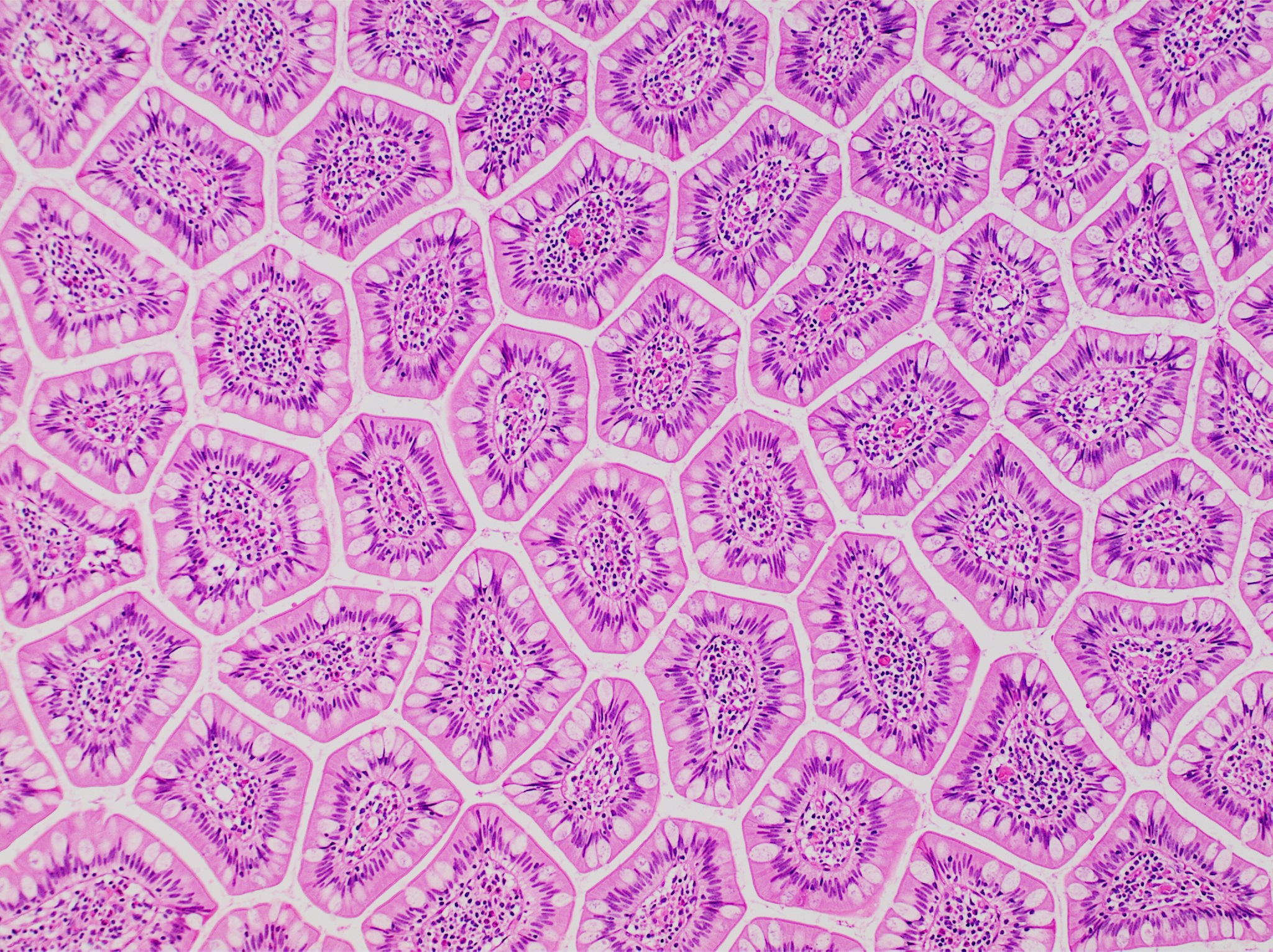
Cross-section histology of small intestinal villi of the human terminal ileum.

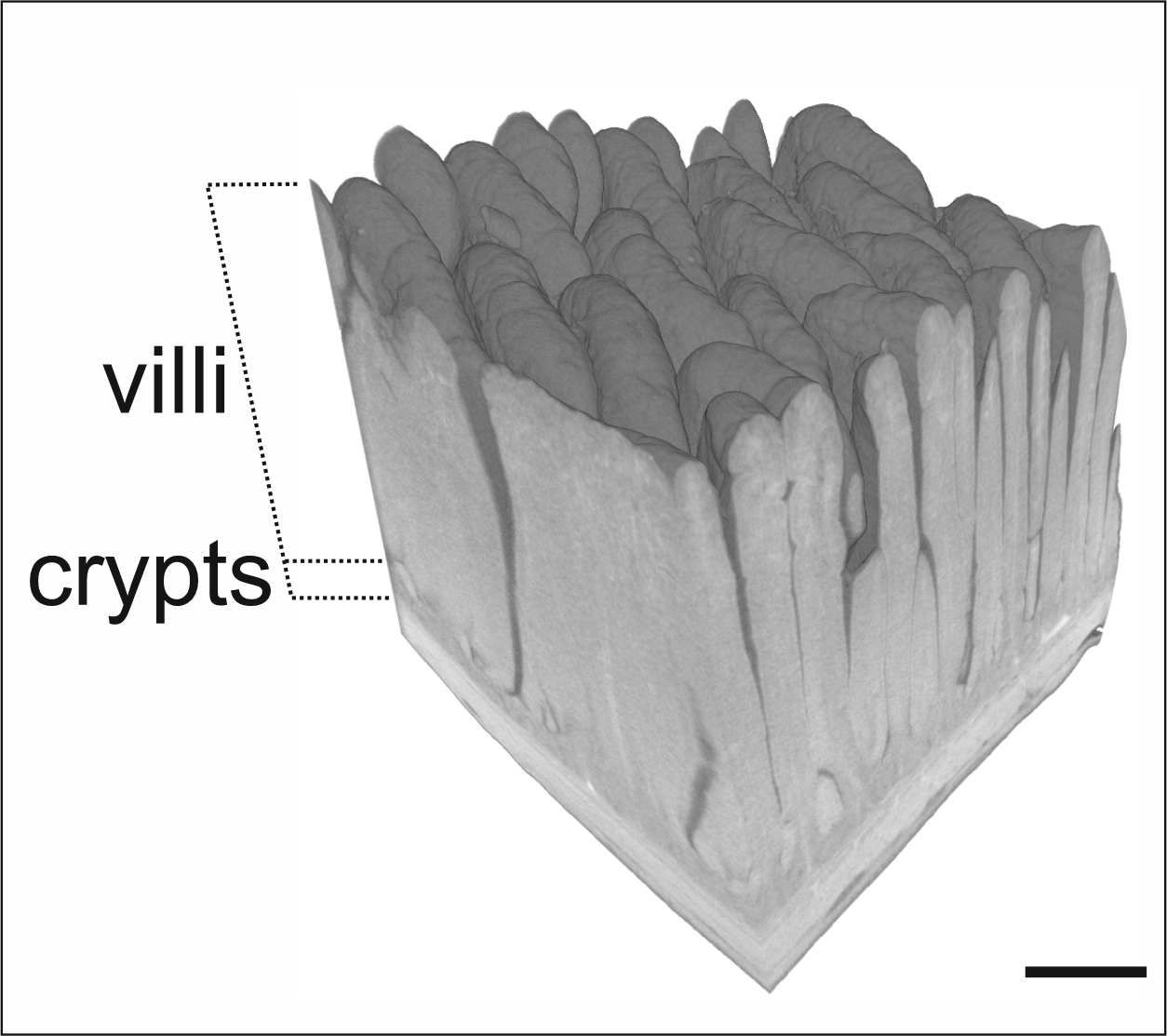
MicroCT-based volume projection of the jejunal mucosa of a chicken. Virtual volume block with vertically truncated villi in oblique view. Scalebar = 0.2 mm.

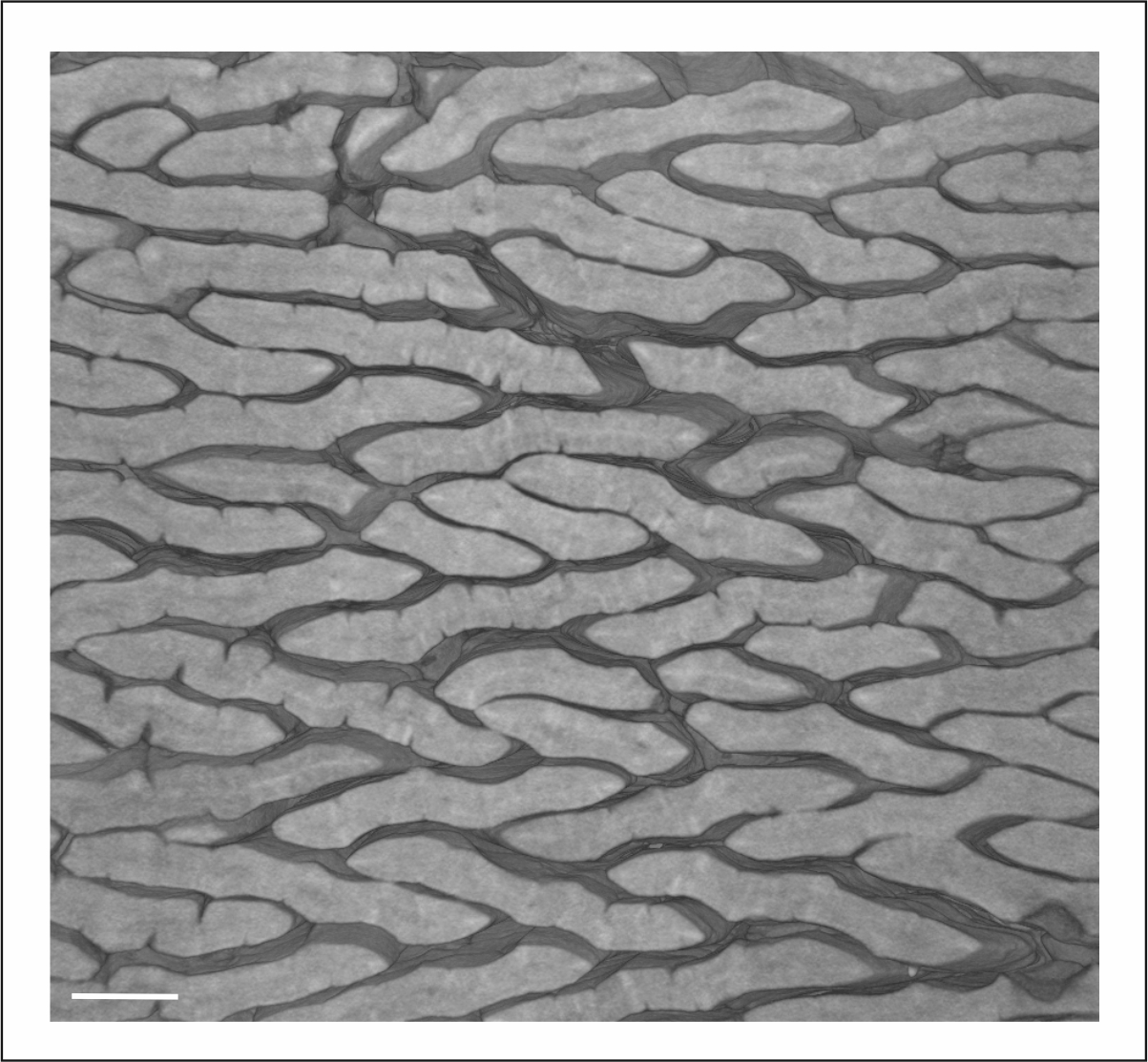
MicroCT-based volume projection of the jejunal mucosa of a chicken. Virtual horizontal cut through villi. Scalebar = 0.2 mm.

Enterocytes, along with goblet cells, represent the principal cell types of the epithelium of the villi in the small intestine.

== Function ==
There, the villi and the microvilli increase intestinal absorptive surface area approximately 40-fold and 600-fold, respectively, providing exceptionally efficient absorption of nutrients in the lumen.

There are also enzymes (enterocyte digestive enzyme) on the surface for digestion. Villus capillaries collect amino acids and simple sugars taken up by the villi into the blood stream. Villus lacteals (lymph capillaries) collect absorbed chylomicrons, which are lipoproteins composed of triglycerides, cholesterol and amphipathic proteins, and are taken to the rest of the body through the lymph fluid.

Villi are specialized for absorption in the small intestine as they have a thin wall, one cell thick, which enables a shorter diffusion path. They have a large surface area so there will be more efficient absorption of fatty acids and glycerol into the blood stream. They have a rich blood supply to keep a concentration gradient.

Structure of a villus (see reference quoted in text)

== Clinical significance ==
=== Villous atrophy ===
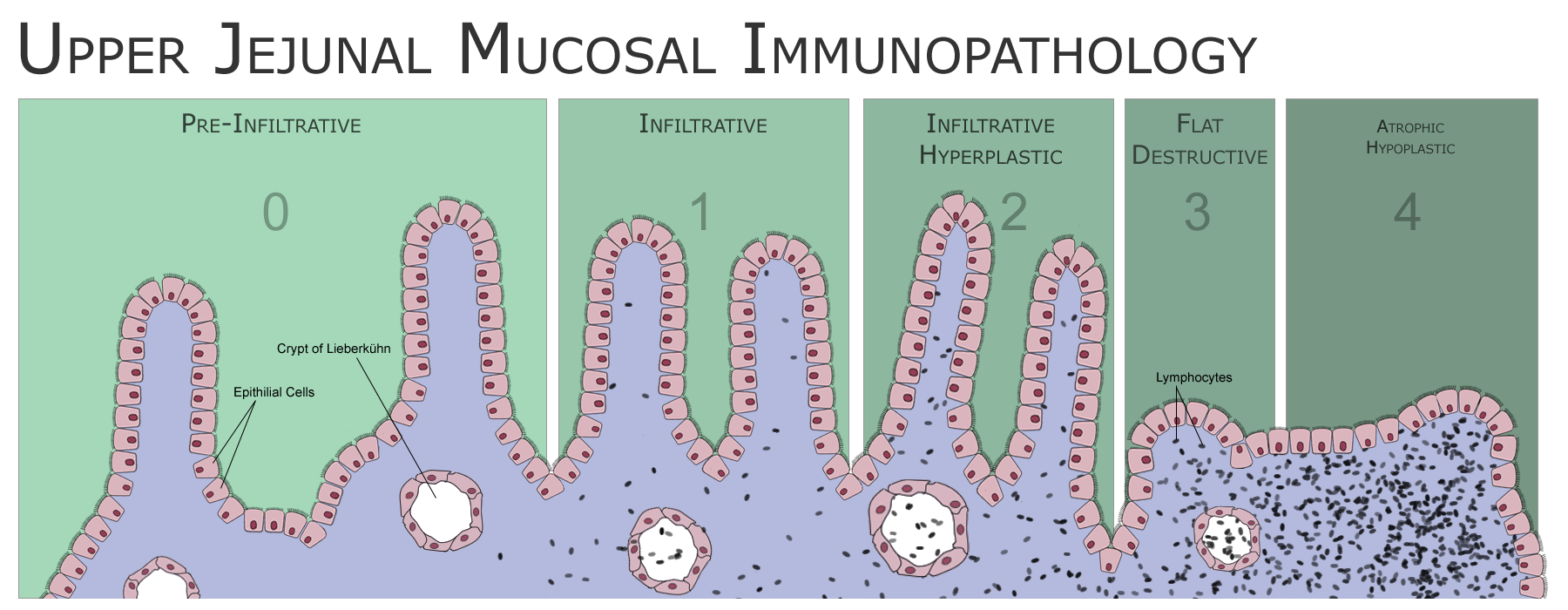
Different stages of coeliac disease

In diseases of the small intestine the villi can become flattened due to the effects of inflammation, and the villi can sometimes disappear. This deterioration is known as villous atrophy, and is often a feature of coeliac disease.

== Additional images ==
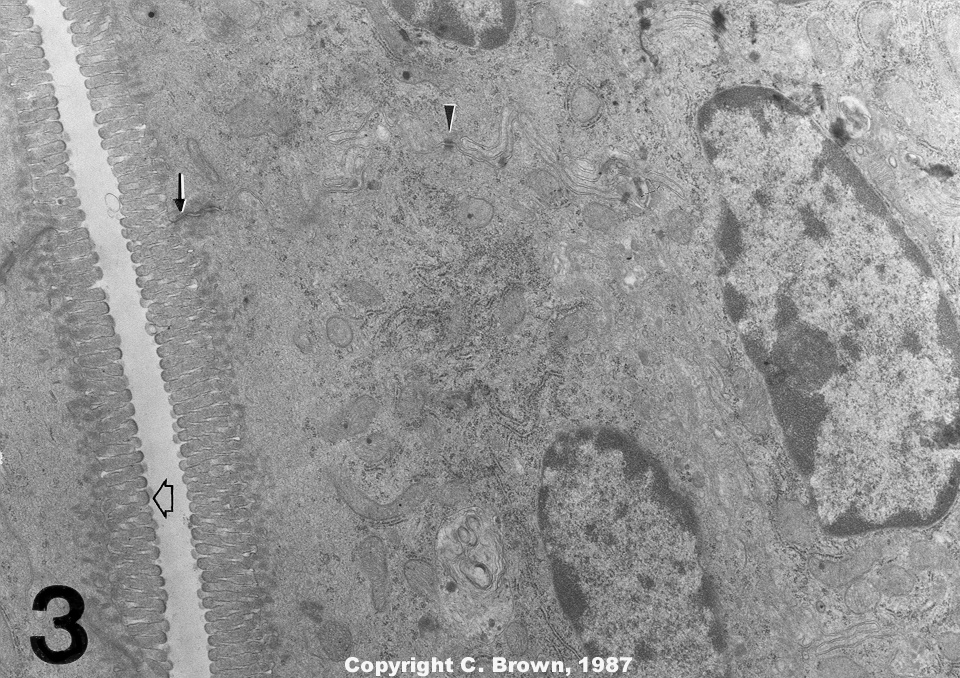
Microvilli (shaggy hair) show electron dense plaques (open arrow) at their apices.
