= Lymph =

Fluid that circulates throughout the lymphatic system

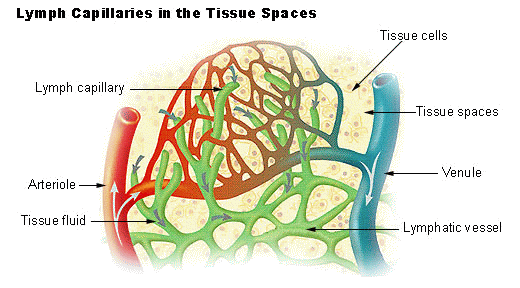
- Diagram showing the formation of lymph from interstitial fluid (labeled here as "Tissue fluid"). Note how the tissue fluid is entering the blind ends of lymph capillaries (shown as deep green arrows).

Details
- System: Lymphatic system
- Source: Formed from interstitial fluid

Identifiers
- Latin: lympha
- MeSH: D008196
- TA98: A12.0.00.043
- TA2: 3893
- FMA: 9671

Lymph (from Latin lympha 'water') is the fluid that flows through the lymphatic system, a system composed of lymph vessels (channels) and intervening lymph nodes whose function, similar to the venous system, is to return fluid from the tissues to be recirculated. At the origin of the fluid-return process, interstitial fluid—the fluid between the cells in all body tissues—enters the lymph capillaries. This lymphatic fluid is then transported via progressively larger lymphatic vessels through lymph nodes, where substances are removed by tissue lymphocytes and circulating lymphocytes are added to the fluid, before emptying ultimately into the right or the left subclavian vein, where it mixes with central venous blood.

Because it is derived from interstitial fluid, with which blood and surrounding cells continually exchange substances, lymph undergoes continual change in composition. It is generally similar to blood plasma, which is the fluid component of blood. Lymph returns proteins and excess interstitial fluid to the bloodstream. Lymph also transports fats from the digestive system (beginning in the lacteals) to the blood via chylomicrons.

Bacteria may enter the lymph channels and be transported to lymph nodes, where the bacteria are destroyed. Metastatic cancer cells can also be transported via lymph.

== Etymology ==
The word lymph is derived from the name of the ancient Roman deity of fresh water, Lympha.

== Structure ==
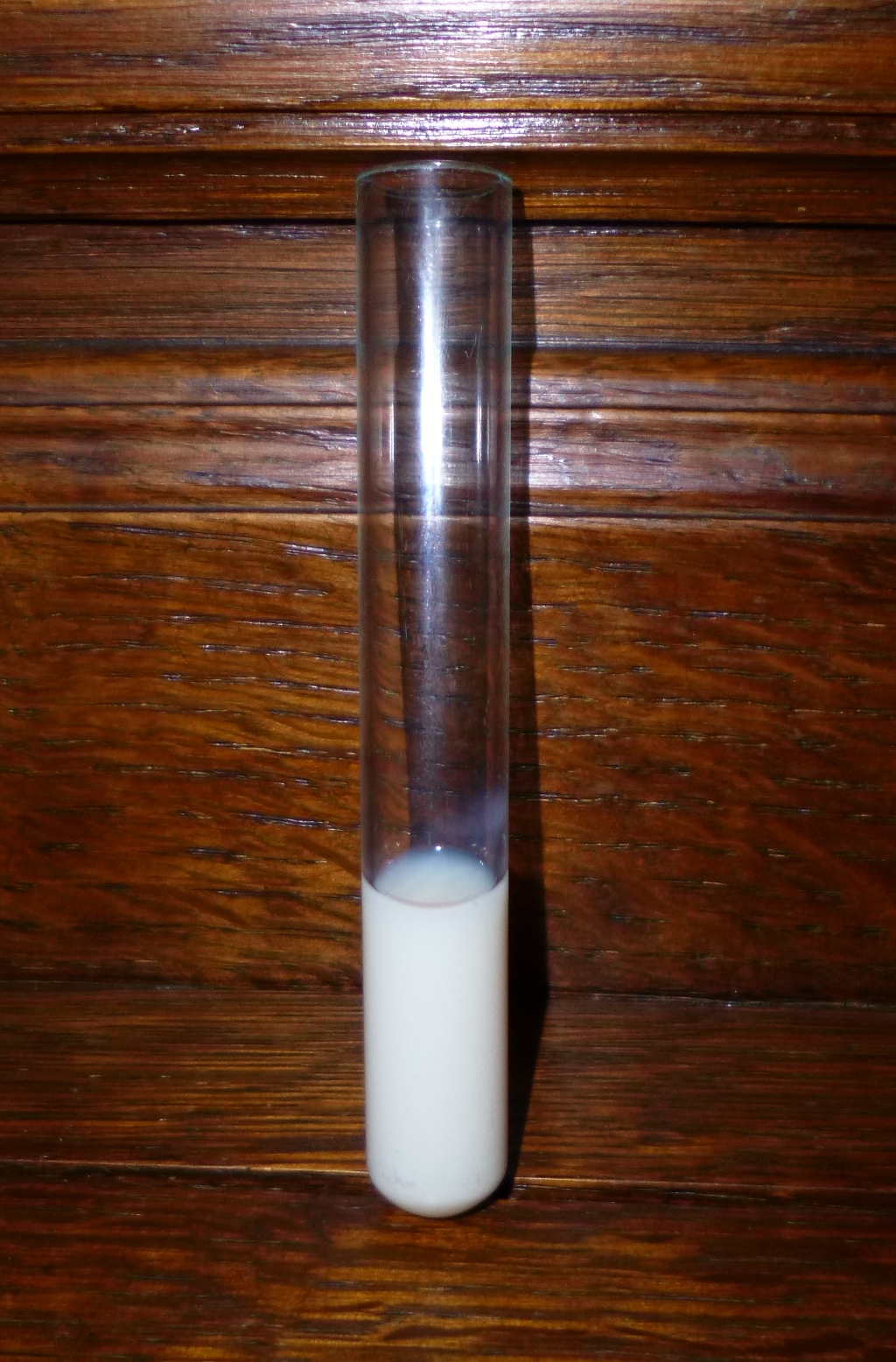
Human lymph, obtained after a thoracic duct injury

Lymph has a composition similar to that of blood plasma. Lymph that leaves a lymph node is richer in lymphocytes than blood plasma is. The lymph formed in the human digestive system called chyle is rich in triglycerides (fat), and looks milky white because of its lipid content.

== Development ==
Formation of interstitial fluid from blood. Starling forces are labelled: the hydrostatic pressure is higher proximally, driving fluid out; oncotic forces are higher distally, pulling fluid in.

Blood supplies nutrients and important metabolites to the cells of a tissue and collects back the waste products they produce, which requires exchange of respective constituents between the blood and tissue cells. This exchange is not direct, but instead occurs through an intermediary called interstitial fluid, which occupies the spaces between cells. As the blood and the surrounding cells continually add and remove substances from the interstitial fluid, its composition continually changes. Water and solutes can pass between the interstitial fluid and blood via diffusion across gaps in capillary walls called intercellular clefts; thus, the blood and interstitial fluid are in dynamic equilibrium with each other.

Interstitial fluid forms at the arterial (coming from the heart) end of capillaries because of the higher pressure of blood compared to veins, and most of it returns to its venous ends and venules; the rest (up to 10%) enters the lymph capillaries as lymph. (Prior to entry, this fluid is referred to as the lymph obligatory load, or LOL, as the lymphatic system is effectively "obliged" to return it to the cardiovascular network.) The lymph when formed is a watery clear liquid with the same composition as the interstitial fluid. However, as it flows through the lymph nodes it comes in contact with blood, and tends to accumulate more cells (particularly, lymphocytes) and proteins.

== Functions ==
=== Components ===
Lymph returns proteins and excess interstitial fluid to the bloodstream. Lymph may pick up bacteria and transport them to lymph nodes, where the bacteria are destroyed. Metastatic cancer cells can also be transported via lymph. Lymph also transports fats from the digestive system (beginning in the lacteals) to the blood via chylomicrons.

=== Circulation ===
Tubular vessels transport lymph back to the blood, ultimately replacing the volume lost during the formation of the interstitial fluid. These channels are the lymphatic channels, or simply lymphatics.

Unlike the cardiovascular system, the lymphatic system is not closed. In some amphibian and reptilian species, the lymphatic system has central pumps, called lymph hearts, which typically exist in pairs, but humans and other mammals do not have a central lymph pump. Lymph transport is slow and sporadic. Despite low pressure, lymph movement occurs due to peristalsis (propulsion of the lymph due to alternate contraction and relaxation of smooth muscle tissue), valves, and compression during contraction of adjacent skeletal muscle and arterial pulsation.

Lymph that enters the lymph vessels from the interstitial spaces usually does not flow backwards along the vessels because of the presence of valves. If excessive hydrostatic pressure develops within the lymph vessels, though, some fluid can leak back into the interstitial spaces and contribute to formation of edema.

The flow of lymph in the thoracic duct in an average resting person usually approximates 100ml per hour. Accompanied by another ~25ml per hour in other lymph vessels, the total lymph flow in the body is about 4 to 5 litres per day. This can be elevated several fold while exercising. It is estimated that without lymphatic flow, the average resting person would die within 24 hours.

== Clinical significance ==
Because lymph is interstitial fluid that has been collected by the lymphatic system, diseases arising from primary abnormalities of the lymphatic fluid do not occur. Diseases such as lymphedema occur when the lymphatic ducts are swollen, usually as a result of blockage at the level of lymph nodes. Primary diseases of the lymphatic ducts include benign (lymphangioma) and malignant (lymphangiosarcoma) tumours.

Histopathological examination of the lymph system is used as a screening tool for immune system analysis in conjunction with pathological changes in other organ systems and clinical pathology to assess disease status. Although histological assessment of the lymph system does not directly measure immune function, it can be combined with identification of chemical biomarkers to determine underlying changes in the diseased immune system.

== As a growth medium ==
In 1907 the zoologist Ross Granville Harrison demonstrated the growth of frog nerve cell processes in a medium of clotted lymph. It is made up of lymph nodes and vessels.

In 1913, E. Steinhardt, C. Israeli, and R. A. Lambert grew vaccinia virus in fragments of tissue culture from guinea pig cornea grown in lymph.

== See also ==
- Body fluid
- Biofluid dynamics
