= Lipase maturation factor 1 =

Protein-coding gene in the species Homo sapiens

LMF1

Identifiers
- Aliases: LMF1, C16orf26, HMFN1876, JFP11, TMEM112, TMEM112A, lipase maturation factor 1
- External IDs: OMIM: 611761; MGI: 1923733; HomoloGene: 23384; GeneCards: LMF1; OMA:LMF1 - orthologs

Gene location (Human)
Chr.	Chromosome 16 (human)
Band	16p13.3	Start	853,634 bp
Band	16p13.3	End	981,318 bp

Gene location (Mouse)
Chr.	Chromosome 17 (mouse)
Band	17 A3.3|17 12.7 cM	Start	25,798,059 bp
Band	17 A3.3|17 12.7 cM	End	25,881,800 bp
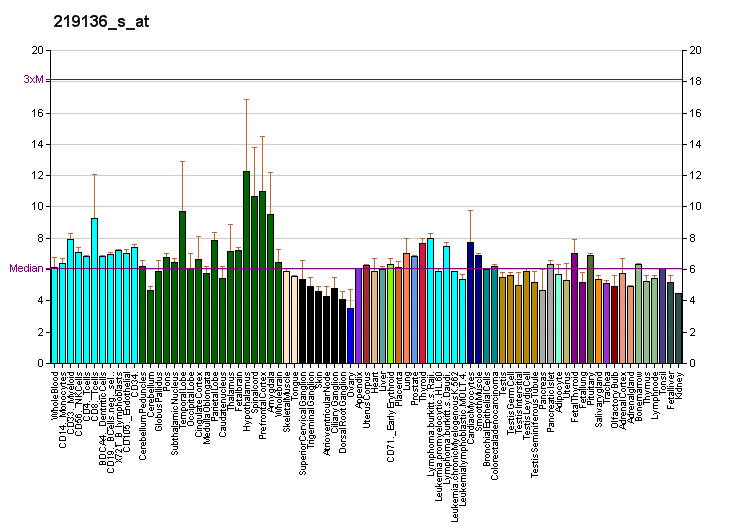

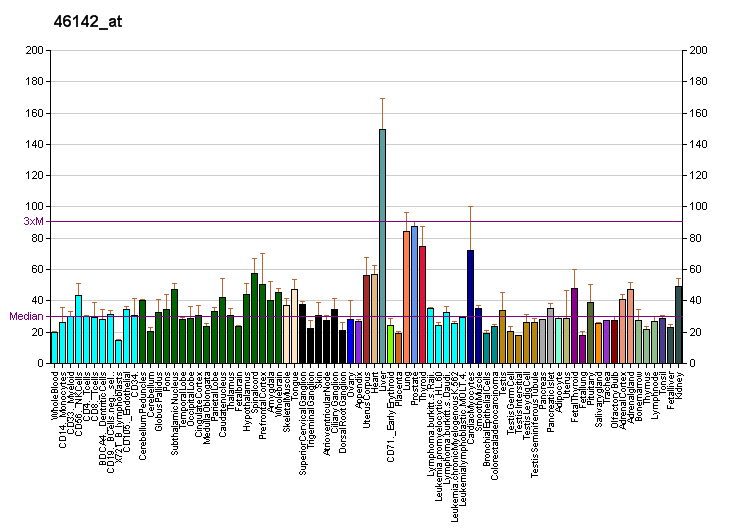

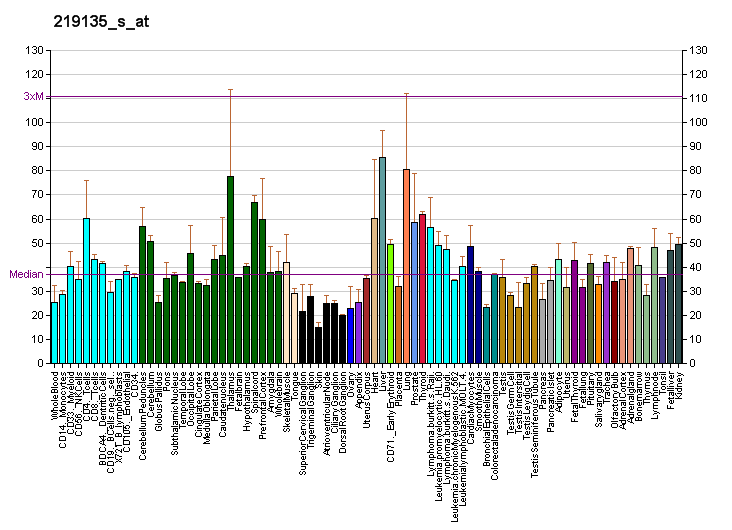
RNA expression pattern
Bgee	Human / Mouse (ortholog); Top expressed in: right uterine tube; C1 segment; sural nerve; right lobe of thyroid gland; left lobe of thyroid gland; parotid gland; granulocyte; body of pancreas; body of stomach; apex of heart / Top expressed in: spermatocyte; spermatid; seminiferous tubule; right kidney; parotid gland; left lobe of liver; lactiferous gland; yolk sac; interventricular septum; muscle of thigh; More reference expression data
BioGPS	More reference expression data
Orthologs
Species	Human	Mouse
Entrez	64788	76483
Ensembl	ENSG00000103227	ENSMUSG00000002279
UniProt	Q96S06	Q3U3R4
RefSeq (mRNA)	NM_001352017; NM_001352018; NM_001352019; NM_001352020; NM_001352021 NM_022773	NM_029624
RefSeq (protein)	NP_073610; NP_001338946; NP_001338947; NP_001338948; NP_001338949 NP_001338950	NP_083900
Location (UCSC)	Chr 16: 0.85 – 0.98 Mb	Chr 17: 25.8 – 25.88 Mb
PubMed search
- Wikidata
View/Edit Human	View/Edit Mouse

Lipase maturation factor 1 is an enzyme that in humans is encoded by the LMF1 gene. This protein is involved in the maturation and transport of lipoprotein lipase. Pathogenic variants in this gene have been associated with a disorder called Combined Lipase Deficiency, which involves reduced lipoprotein lipase and hepatic lipase activity leading to excessive accumulation of fat and chylomicrons in the blood.
