= Peperomia venulosa =

Scientific classification
- Kingdom: Plantae
- Clade: Tracheophytes
- Clade: Angiosperms
- Clade: Magnoliids
- Order: Piperales
- Family: Piperaceae
- Genus: Peperomia
- Species: P. venulosa

Binomial name
- Peperomia venulosa Yunck.

Species of epiphyte

Peperomia venulosa is a species of epiphyte from the genus Peperomia. It grows in wet tropical biomes. It was first described by Truman G. Yuncker in 1957.

== Etymology ==
Venulosa came from the word "venule". Venule is a small vein that connects capillaries to a larger vein.

== Subtaxa ==
Two varieties are recognized:

- Peperomia venulosa var. avenulosa Yunck.
- Peperomia venulosa var. venulosa

== Distribution ==
Peperomia venulosa is native to Peru, Colombia, and Ecuador. In Colombia, specimens are collected at an elevation of 780–1900 meters. Specimens in Peru and Ecuador can be found at an elevation of 800-2015 meters.
