= Intercellular cleft =

Channel between two cells

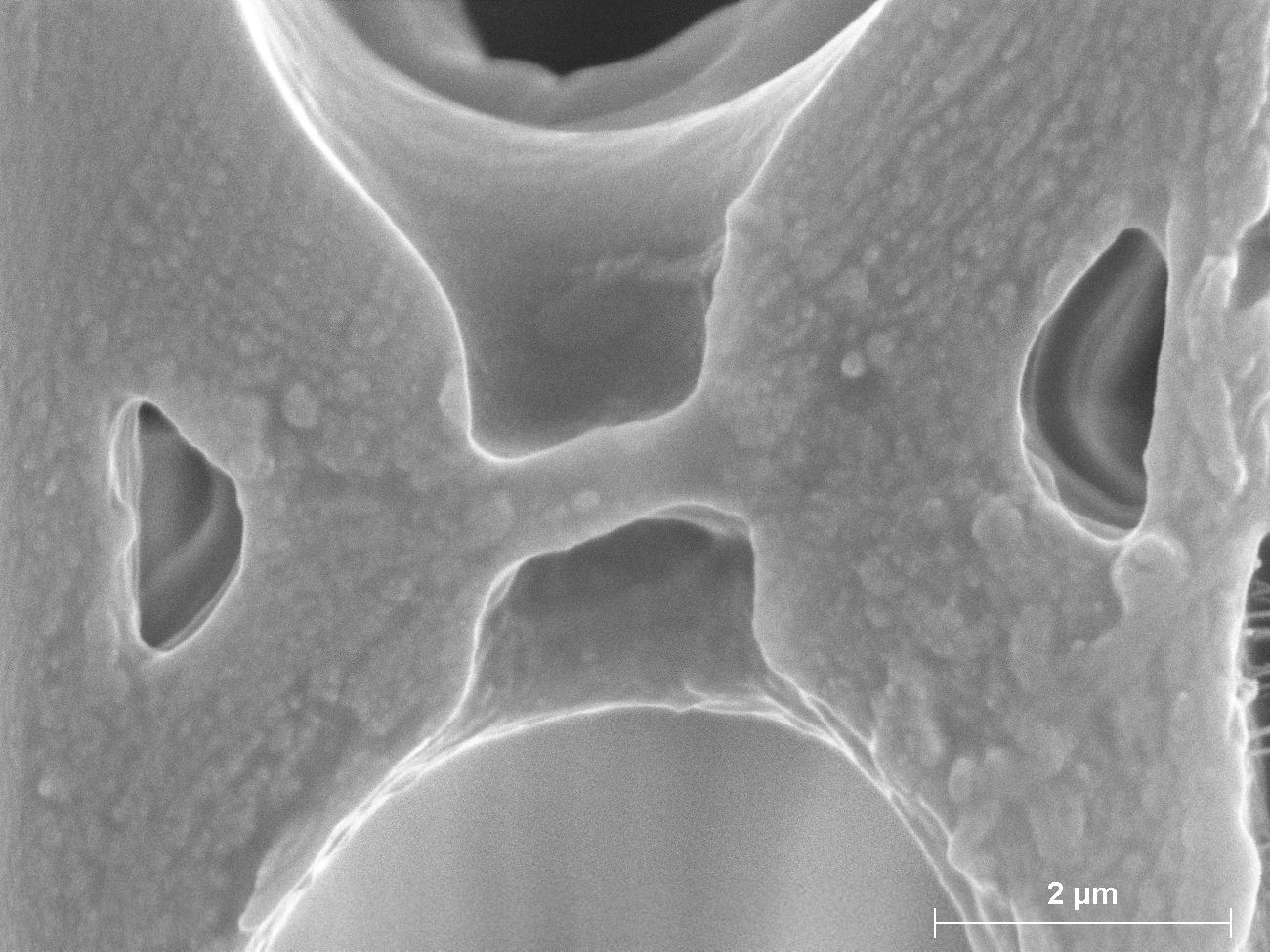
Simple pit and intercellular spaces between two ray parenchyma cells

An intercellular cleft is a channel between two cells through which molecules may travel and gap junctions and tight junctions may be present. Most notably, intercellular clefts are often found between epithelial cells and the endothelium of blood vessels and lymphatic vessels, also helping to form the blood-nerve barrier surrounding nerves. Intercellular clefts are important for allowing the transportation of fluids and small solute matter through the endothelium.

== Dimensions of intercellular cleft ==
The dimensions of intercellular clefts vary throughout the body, however cleft lengths have been determined for a series of capillaries. The average cleft length for capillaries is about 20m/cm^{2}. The depths of the intercellular clefts, measured from the luminal to the abluminal openings, vary among different types of capillaries, but the average is about 0.7 μm. The width of the intercellular clefts is about 20 nm outside the junctional region (i.e. in the larger part of the clefts). In intercellular clefts of capillaries, it has been calculated that the fractional area of the capillary wall occupied by the intercellular cleft is 20m/cm^{2} x 20 nm (length x width)= 0.004 (0.4%). This is the fractional area of the capillary wall exposed for free diffusion of small hydrophilic solutes and fluids^{5}.

== Communication via cleft ==
The intercellular cleft is imperative for cell-cell communication. The cleft contains gap junctions, tight junctions, desmosomes, and adheren proteins, all of which help to propagate and/or regulate cell communication through signal transduction, surface receptors, or a chemogradient. In order for a molecule to be taken into the cell either by endocytosis, phagocytosis, or receptor-mediated endocytosis, often that molecule must first enter through the cleft. The intercellular cleft itself is a channel, but what flows through the channel, like ions, fluid, and small molecules and what proteins or junctions give order to the channel is critical for the life of the cells that border the intercellular cleft.

=== Research utilizing cleft communication ===
Research at the cell level can deliver proteins, ions, or specific small molecules into the intercellular cleft as a means of injecting a cell. This method is especially useful in cell-to-cell propagation of infectious cytosolic protein aggregates. In one study, protein aggregates from yeast prions were released into a mammalian intercellular cleft and were taken up by the adjacent cell, as opposed to direct cell transfer. This process would be similar to the secretion and transmission of infectious particles through the synaptic cleft between cells of the immune system, as seen in retroviruses. Understanding the routes of intercellular protein aggregate transfer, particularly routes involving clefts is imperative in understanding the progressive spreading of this infection^{8}.

== Transport in intercellular cleft ==
Endothelial tight junctions are most commonly found in the intercellular cleft and provide for regulation of diffusion through the membranes. These links are most commonly found in the most apical aspect of the intercellular cleft. They prevent macromolecules from navigating the intercellular cleft and limit the lateral diffusion of intrinsic membrane proteins and lipids between the apical and basolateral cell surface domains. In the intercellular clefts of capillaries, tight junctions are the first structural barriers a neutrophil encounters as it penetrates the interendothelial cleft, or the gap linking the blood vessel lumen with the subendothelial space^{2}. In capillary endothelium, plasma communicates with the interstitial fluid through the intercellular cleft. Blood plasma without the plasma proteins, red blood cells, and platelets pass through the intercellular cleft and into the capillary^{7}.

== Capillary intercellular clefts ==
Most notably, intercellular clefts are described in capillary blood vessels. The three types of capillary blood vessels are continuous, fenestrated, and discontinuous, with continuous being the least porous of the three and discontinuous capillaries being extremely high in permeability. Continuous blood capillaries have the smallest intercellular clefts, with discontinuous blood capillaries having the largest intercellular clefts, commonly accompanied with gaps in the basement membrane^{6}.Often, fluid is forced out of the capillaries through the intercellular clefts. Fluid is pushed out through the intercellular cleft at the arterial end of the capillary because that's where the pressure is the highest. However, most of this fluid returns into the capillary at the venous end, creating capillary fluid dynamics. Two opposing forces achieve this balance; hydrostatic pressure and colloid osmotic pressure, using the intercellular clefts as fluid entrances and fluid exits^{4}. In addition, the size of the intercellular clefts and pores in the capillary will influence this fluid exchange. The larger the intercellular cleft, the lesser the pressure and the more fluid will flow out the cleft. This enlargement of the cleft is caused by contraction of capillary endothelial cells, often by substances such as histamine and bradykinin. However, smaller intercellular clefts do not help this fluid exchange^{3}. Along with fluid, electrolytes are also carried through this transport in the capillary blood vessels^{4}. This mechanism of fluid, electrolyte, and also small solute exchange is especially important in renal glomerular capillaries^{3}.

== Intercellular cleft and BHB ==
Intercellular clefts also play a role in the formation of the blood-heart barrier (BHB). The intercellular cleft between endocardial endotheliocytes is 3 to 5 times deeper than the clefts between myocardial capillary endotheliocytes. Also, these clefts are often more twisting and have one or two tight junctions and zona adherens interacting with a circumferential actin filament band and several connecting proteins^{7}. These tight junctions localize to the luminal side of the intercellular clefts, where the glycocalyx, which is important in cell–cell recognition and cell signaling, is more developed. The organization of the endocardial endothelium and the intercellular cleft help to establish the blood-heart barrier by ensuring an active transendothelial physicochemical gradient of various ions^{1}.
