= Oncotic pressure =

Measure of pressure exerted by large dissolved molecules in biological fluids

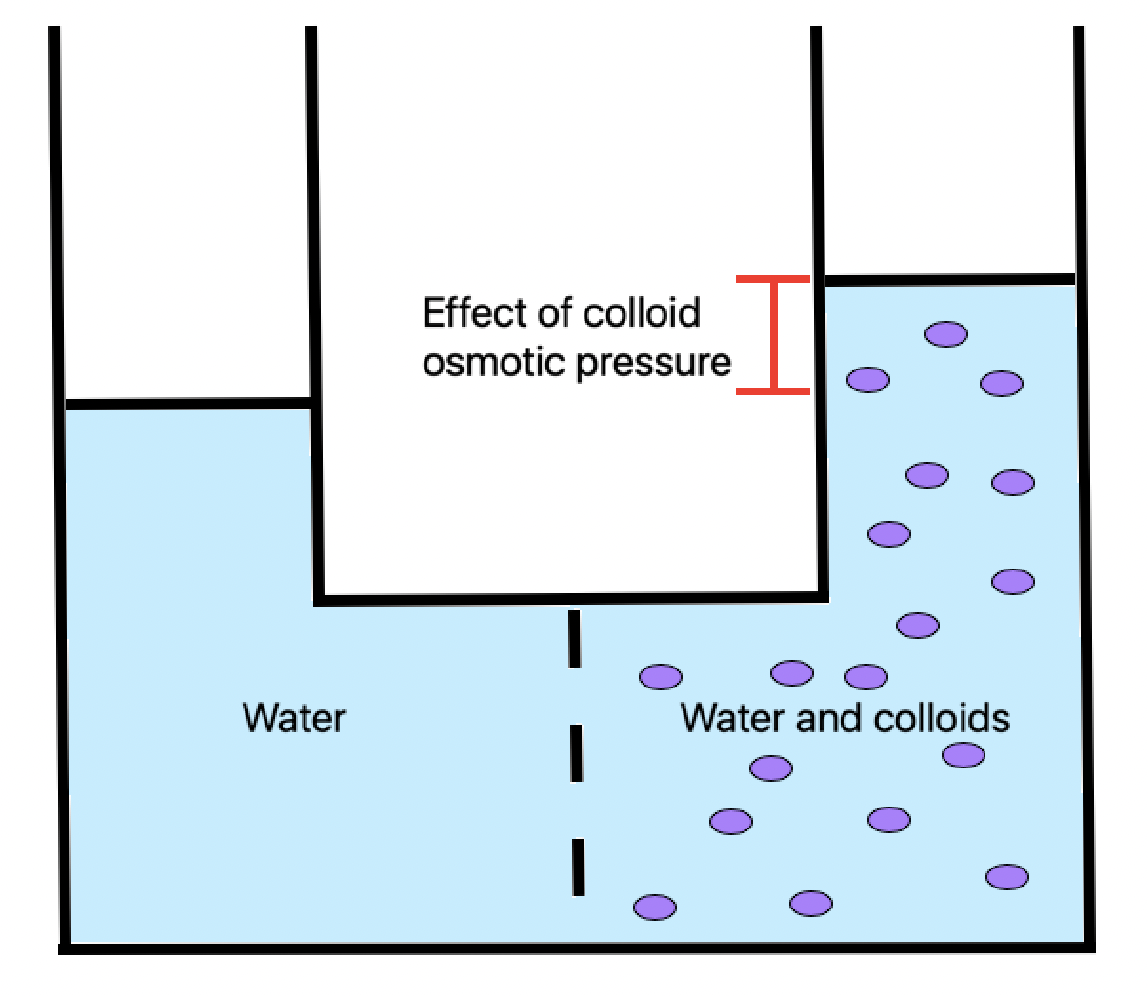
Above, we see a representation of fluid flow in the presence of colloids, with the left side representing surrounding tissues and the right representing whole blood. The presence of colloids can increase the flow towards the high concentration of colloids by creating colloid osmotic pressure in an otherwise state of equilibrium.

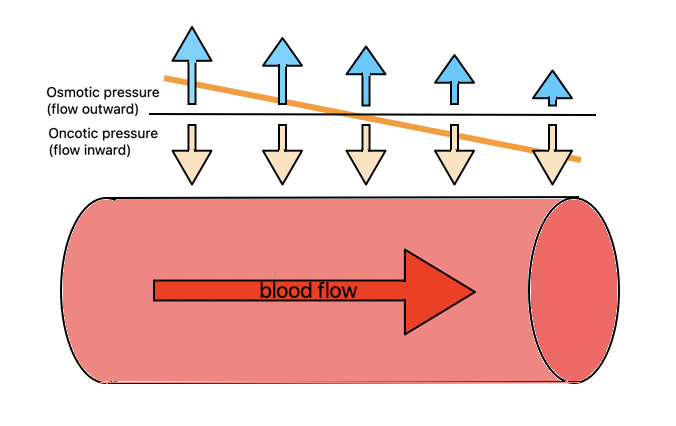
In the illustration above, we see how the osmotic pressure changes over the length of the capillary, with oncotic pressure remaining the same. Overall direction of fluid flow in relation to equal bidirectional flow is shown by the orange and black lines, respectively.

Oncotic pressure, or colloid osmotic-pressure, is a type of osmotic pressure induced by the plasma proteins, notably albumin, in a blood vessel's plasma (or any other body fluid such as lymph) that causes a pull on fluid back into the capillary.

It has an effect opposing both the hydrostatic blood pressure, which pushes water and small molecules out of the blood into the interstitial spaces at the arterial end of capillaries, and the interstitial colloidal osmotic pressure. These interacting factors determine the partitioning of extracellular water between the blood plasma and the extravascular space.

Oncotic pressure strongly affects the physiological function of the circulatory system. It is suspected to have a major effect on the pressure across the glomerular filter. However, this concept has been strongly criticised and attention has shifted to the impact of the intravascular glycocalyx layer as the major player.

== Etymology ==
The word 'oncotic' by definition is termed as 'pertaining to swelling', indicating the effect of oncotic imbalance on the swelling of tissues.

The word itself is derived from onco- and -ic; 'onco-' meaning 'pertaining to mass or tumors' and '-ic', which forms an adjective.

== Description ==
Throughout the body, dissolved compounds have an osmotic pressure. Because large plasma proteins cannot easily cross through the capillary walls, their effect on the osmotic pressure of the capillary interiors will, to some extent, balance out the tendency for fluid to leak out of the capillaries. In other words, the oncotic pressure tends to pull fluid into the capillaries. In conditions where plasma proteins are reduced, e.g. from being lost in the urine (proteinuria), there will be a reduction in oncotic pressure and an increase in filtration across the capillary, resulting in excess fluid buildup in the tissues (edema).

The large majority of oncotic pressure in capillaries is generated by the presence of high quantities of albumin, a protein that constitutes approximately 80% of the total oncotic pressure exerted by blood plasma on interstitial fluid. The total oncotic pressure of an average capillary is about 28 mmHg with albumin contributing approximately 22 mmHg of this oncotic pressure, despite only representing 50% of all protein in blood plasma at 35-50 g/L. Because blood proteins cannot escape through capillary endothelium, oncotic pressure of capillary beds tends to draw water into the vessels. It is necessary to understand the oncotic pressure as a balance; because the blood proteins reduce interior permeability, less plasma fluid can exit the vessel.

Oncotic pressure is represented by the symbol Π or π in the Starling equation and elsewhere. The Starling equation in particular describes filtration in volume/s ($J_\mathrm{v}$) by relating oncotic pressure ($\pi_\mathrm{p}$) to capillary hydrostatic pressure ($P_\mathrm{c}$), interstitial fluid hydrostatic pressure ($P_\mathrm{i}$), and interstitial fluid oncotic pressure ($\pi_\mathrm{i}$), as well as several descriptive coefficients, as shown below:

$\ J_\mathrm{v} = L_\mathrm{p} S ( [P_\mathrm{c} - P_\mathrm{i}] - \sigma[\pi_\mathrm{p} - \pi_\mathrm{i}] )$

At the arteriolar end of the capillary, blood pressure starts at about 36 mm Hg and decreases to around 15 mm Hg at the venous end, with oncotic pressure at a stable 25–28 mm Hg. Within the capillary, reabsorption due to this venous pressure difference is estimated to be around 90% that of the filtered fluid, with the extra 10% being returned via lymphatics in order to maintain stable blood volume.

== Physiological impact ==
In tissues, physiological disruption can arise with decreased oncotic pressure, which can be determined using blood tests for protein concentration.

Decreased colloidal osmotic pressure, most notably seen in hypoalbuminemia, can cause edema and decrease in blood volume as fluid is not reabsorbed into the bloodstream. Colloid pressure in these cases can be lost due to a number of different factors, but primarily decreased colloid production or increased loss of colloids through glomerular filtration. This low pressure often correlates with poor surgical outcomes.

In the clinical setting, there are two types of fluids that are used for intravenous drips: crystalloids and colloids. Crystalloids are aqueous solutions of mineral salts or other water-soluble molecules. Colloids contain larger insoluble molecules, such as gelatin. There is some debate concerning the advantages and disadvantages of using biological vs. synthetic colloid solutions. Oncotic pressure values are approximately 290 mOsm per kg of water, which slightly differs from the osmotic pressure of the blood that has values approximating 300 mOsm /L. These colloidal solutions are typically used to remedy low colloid concentration, such as in hypoalbuminemia, but is also suspected to assist in injuries that typically increase fluid loss, such as burns.
