= Chylomicron =

One of the five major groups of lipoprotein

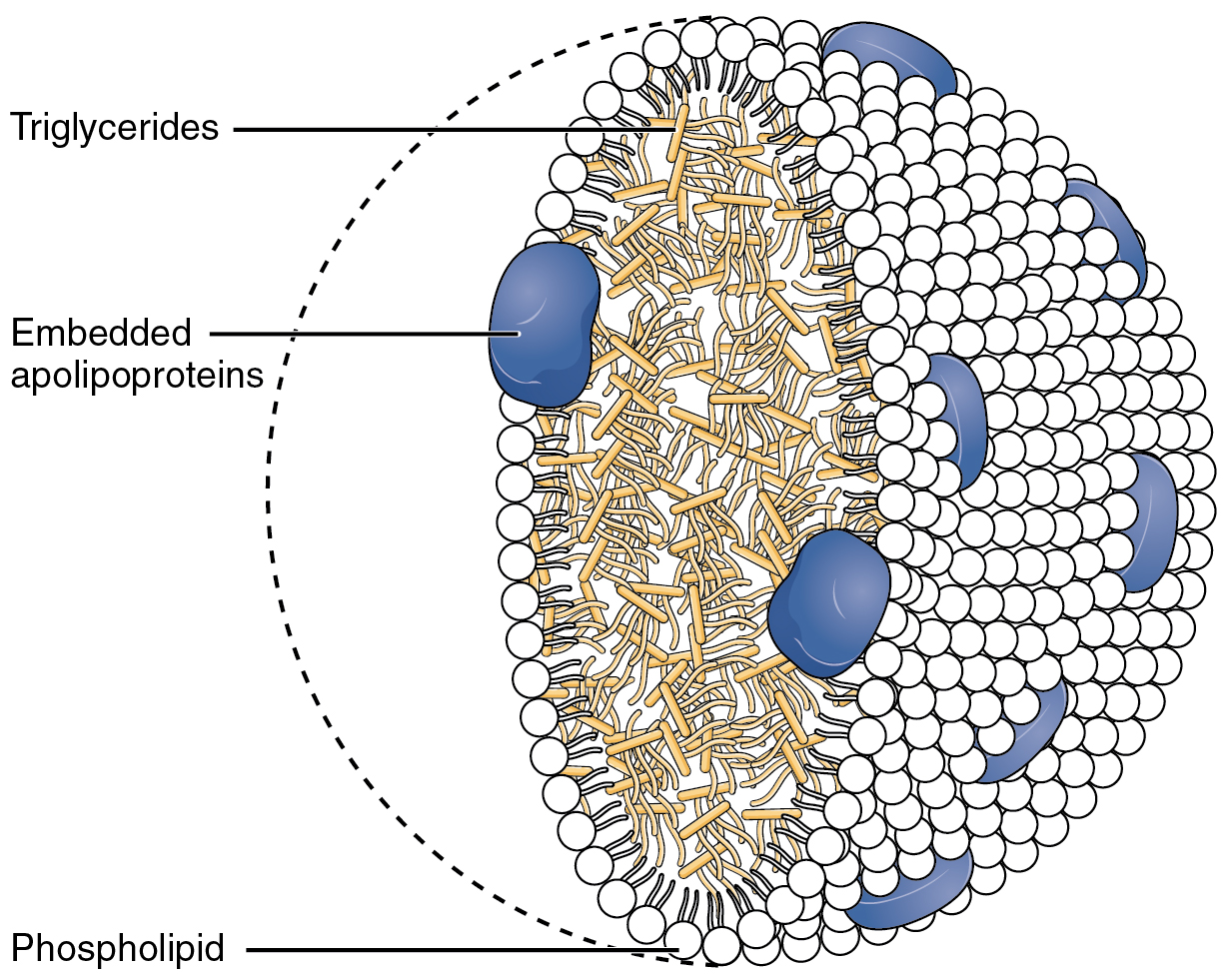
Schematic image showing a chylomicron

Chylomicrons (from the Greek χυλός, chylós, meaning juice (of plants or animals), and micron, meaning small), also known as ultra low-density lipoproteins (ULDL), are lipoprotein particles that consist of triglycerides (83–92%), phospholipids (6–12%), cholesterol (1–3%), and proteins (1–2%). They transport dietary lipids, such as fats and cholesterol, from the intestines to other locations in the body, within the water-based solution of the bloodstream. ULDLs are one of the five major groups lipoproteins are divided into based on their density. A protein specific to chylomicrons is ApoB48.

There is an inverse relationship in the density and size of lipoprotein particles: fats have a lower density than water or smaller protein molecules, and the larger particles have a higher ratio of internal fat molecules with respect to the outer emulsifying protein molecules in the shell. ULDLs, if in the region of 1,000 nm or more, are the only lipoprotein particles that can be seen using a light microscope, at maximum magnification. All the other classes are submicroscopic.

== Function ==
Chylomicron structure ApoA, ApoB, ApoC, ApoE (apolipoproteins); T (triacylglycerol); C (cholesterol); green (phospholipids)

Chylomicrons transport lipids absorbed from the intestine to adipose, cardiac, and skeletal muscle tissue, where their triglyceride components are hydrolyzed by the activity of the lipoprotein lipase, allowing the released free fatty acids to be absorbed by the tissues. When a large portion of the triglyceride core has been hydrolyzed, chylomicron remnants are formed and are taken up by the liver, thereby also transferring dietary fat to the liver.

== Stages ==
=== Nascent chylomicrons ===
In the small intestine, dietary triglycerides are emulsified by bile and digested by pancreatic lipases, resulting in the formation of monoglycerides and fatty acids. These lipids are absorbed into enterocytes via passive diffusion. Inside these cells, monoglycerides and fatty acids are transported to the smooth endoplasmic reticulum (smooth ER), where they are re-esterified to form triglycerides. These triglycerides, along with phospholipids and cholesterol, are added to apolipoprotein B48 to form nascent chylomicrons (also referred to as immature chylomicrons or pre-chylomicrons).

After synthesis in the smooth ER, nascent chylomicrons are transported to the Golgi apparatus by SAR1B proteins. The transport of nascent chylomicrons within the secretory pathway is facilitated by protein transport vesicles (PCTVs). PCTVs are uniquely equipped with v-SNARE and VAMP-7 proteins, which aid in their fusion with the cis-Golgi compartment. This transport is facilitated by COPII proteins, including Sec23/24, which select cargo and facilitate vesicle budding from the ER membrane.

During transit through the Golgi, nascent chylomicrons undergo enzymatic modification and lipidation processes, resulting in the formation of mature chylomicrons.

=== Mature chylomicrons ===
Mature chylomicrons are released through the basolateral membrane of enterocytes (via the secretory pathway) into lacteals, lymphatic capillaries in the villi of the small intestine. Lymph that contains chylomicrons (and other emulsified fats) is referred to as chyle. The lymphatic circulation carries chyle to the lymphatic ducts before it enters the venous return of the systemic circulation via subclavian veins. From here, chylomicrons can supply tissue throughout the body with fat absorbed from the diet. Because they enter the bloodstream in this way, digested lipids (in the form of chylomicrons) bypass the hepatic portal system and thus avoid first pass metabolism, unlike digested carbohydrates (in the form of monosaccharides) and proteins (in the form of amino acids).

While circulating in blood, high-density lipoproteins (HDLs) donate essential components including apolipoprotein C-II (APOC2) and apolipoprotein E (APOE) to the mature chylomicron. APOC2 is a crucial coenzyme for the activity of lipoprotein lipase (LPL), which hydrolyzes triglycerides within chylomicrons.

=== Chylomicron remnants ===
Once triglyceride stores are distributed, chylomicrons return APOC2 to HDLs while retaining APOE, transforming into a chylomicron remnant. ApoB48 and APOE are important to identify the chylomicron remnant in the liver for endocytosis and breakdown.

== Pathology ==
=== Hyperchylomicronemia ===
Hyperchylomicronemia is characterized by an excessive presence of chylomicrons in the blood, leading to extreme hypertriglyceridemia. Clinical manifestations of this disorder include eruptive xanthomas, lipaemia retinalis, hepatosplenomegaly, recurrent abdominal pain, and acute pancreatitis. This condition can be caused by genetic mutations (see below) or secondary factors such as uncontrolled diabetes or alcohol use disorder.

=== Hypochylomicronemia ===
Hypochylomicronemia refers to abnormally low levels or complete absence of chylomicrons in the blood, particularly after a meal (postprandial). This condition can result from genetic mutations (see below), as well as certain malabsorption syndromes or deficiencies in dietary fat intake.

== Related disorders ==
=== Chylomicron remnants and cardiovascular disease ===
Chylomicron remnants are the lipoprotein particles left after chylomicrons have delivered triglycerides to tissues. Elevated levels of these remnants contribute to hyperlipidemia, which is considered an important risk factor for cardiovascular disease.

Recent studies have demonstrated that chylomicron remnants can penetrate the tunica intima and become trapped in the subendothelial space. This process enhances the deposition of cholesterol in the arterial wall, which is a critical step in the formation of atherosclerotic plaques. The retention and modification of these remnants within the arterial wall trigger inflammatory responses, further accelerating the development of atherosclerosis.

=== Related genetic disorders ===
==== Abetalipoproteinemia (ABL) ====
Abetalipoproteinemia (ABL; OMIM 200100) is a rare autosomal recessive disorder caused by mutations in both alleles of the MTP gene. This genetic defect leads to nearly undetectable levels of ApoB and very low plasma cholesterol levels. Patients with ABL exhibit fat malabsorption, steatorrhea, and fat accumulation in enterocytes and hepatocytes. The condition also results in multiple vitamin deficiencies (E, A, K, and D) due to impaired lipoprotein assembly and transport. If untreated, ABL can cause neurological disturbances such as spinal-cerebellar degeneration, peripheral neuropathies, and retinitis pigmentosa. Early supplementation of fat-soluble vitamins can prevent these complications.

==== Homozygous hypobetalipoproteinemia (Ho-HBL) ====
Homozygous hypobetalipoproteinemia (Ho-HBL; OMIM 107730) is an extremely rare inherited disorder characterized by improper packaging and secretion of apoB-containing lipoproteins due to mutations in both alleles of the APOB gene. These mutations lead to apoB truncations or amino acid substitutions, resulting in the formation of short, abnormal apoBs that are unable to bind lipids and form chylomicrons. Clinical manifestations vary, ranging from lack of symptoms to features overlapping with those of ABL, including fat malabsorption and vitamin deficiencies.

==== Chylomicron retention disease (CMRD) ====
Chylomicron retention disease (CMRD; OMIM #607689) is a rare autosomal recessive disorder caused by mutations in the SAR1B gene. Patients with CMRD present with chronic diarrhea, failure to thrive, hypocholesterolemia, and low levels of fat-soluble vitamins. The enterocytes of these patients fail to secrete chylomicrons into the lymph, leading to lipid accumulation and characteristic mucosal changes in the small intestine. Unlike ABL and Ho-HBL, CMRD does not cause acanthocytosis, retinitis pigmentosa, or severe neurological symptoms.

==== Familial chylomicronemia syndrome (FCS) ====
Familial chylomicronemia syndrome (FCS), also known as Type I hyperlipoproteinemia, is characterized by massive hypertriglyceridemia, abdominal pain, pancreatitis, eruptive xanthomas, and hepatosplenomegaly. This condition is caused by mutations in genes such as LPL, APOC-II, APOA-V, LMF1, and GPIHBP1, which are involved in the regulation of triglyceride-rich lipoprotein catabolism. Patients with FCS show significantly elevated fasting concentrations of chylomicrons and do not typically develop premature atherosclerosis due to the large size of chylomicrons preventing their traversal through the vascular endothelial barrier. Diagnosis is confirmed by DNA sequencing for pathogenic mutations in these genes.
