= Chyle =

Milky bodily fluid consisting of lymph and emulsified fats

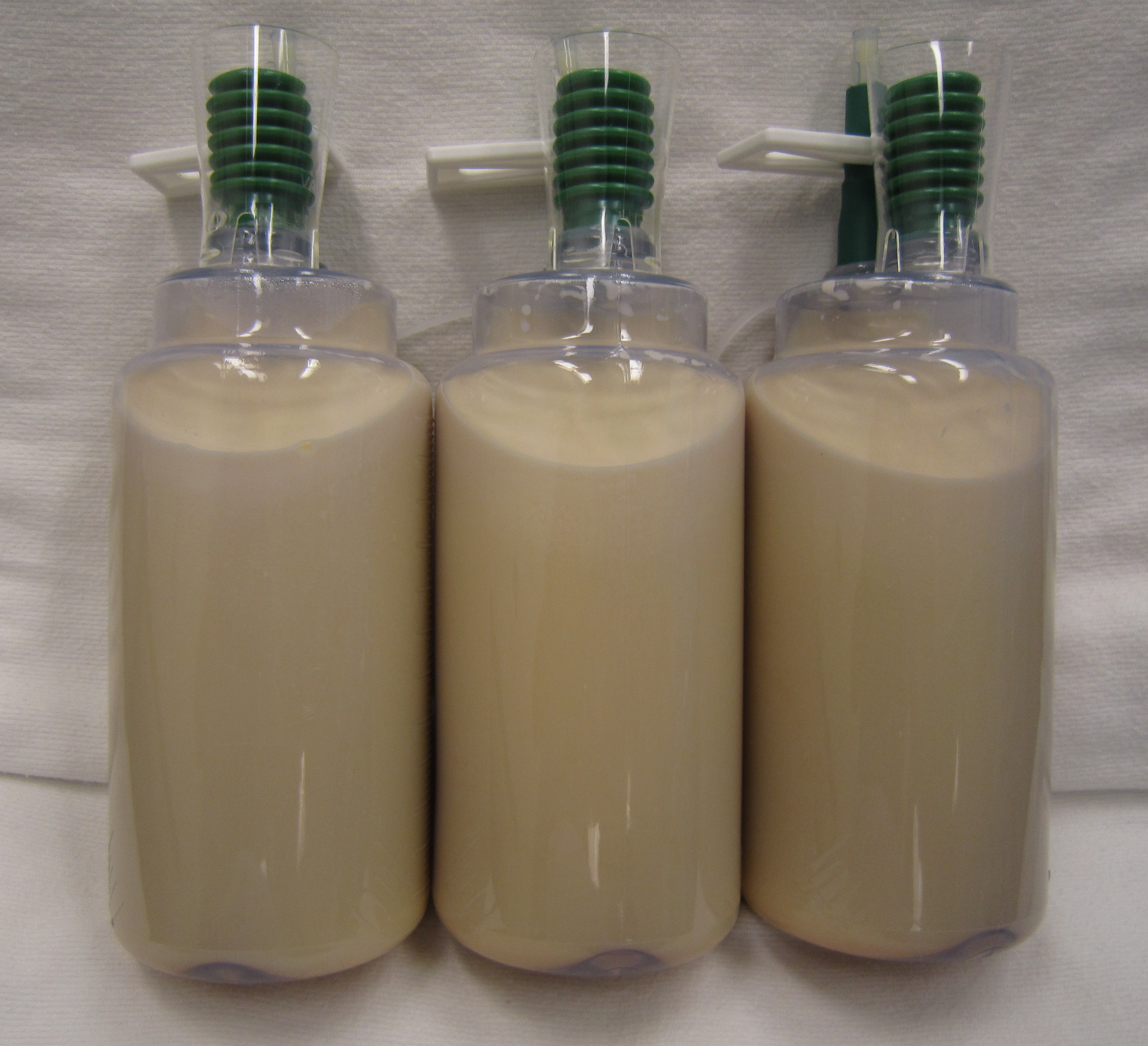
- Chyle drained from someone with chylothorax, showing the characteristic milky appearance of the liquid.

Details
- Pronunciation: /kaɪl/
- System: Lymphatic system
- Location: Formed in the small intestine

Identifiers
- MeSH: D002913
- FMA: 61403

Chyle (/kaɪl/; from Greek χυλός (chylos) 'chyle') is a milky bodily fluid consisting of lymph and emulsified fats, or free fatty acids (FFAs). It is formed in the small intestine during digestion of fatty foods, and taken up by lymph vessels specifically known as lacteals. The lipids in the chyle are colloidally suspended in chylomicrons. Its principal role is to carry dietary fats and fat-soluble vitamins from the intestine into the venous circulation after digestion.

== Clinical significance ==
A chyle fistula occurs when defect(s) of lymphatic vessel(s) result in leakage of lymphatic fluid, typically accumulating in the thoracic (pleural) or abdominal (peritoneal) cavities, leading to a chylous pleural effusion (chylothorax) or chylous ascites, respectively. Leakage of lymphatic fluid and decreased chyle volume result in the loss of fluid, electrolytes, proteins, and lymphocytes, leading to complications with nutrition, wound healing, and immunity.

Diagnosis of a chyle fistula may be accomplished by analysis of pleural/peritoneal fluid. Identifying the source (localizing the lymphatic defect) is often challenging, but may be accomplished with lymphangiography, which is occasionally associated with a serendipitous therapeutic effect (resolution of the leak), thought to be secondary to a sclerosant effect of the lymphangiography contrast.

Because of the extreme friability of the lymphatic vessels, direct repair of defects is impractical. Therefore, treatment of chyle fistulae relies upon either decreased production of lymphatic fluid to allow for healing of lymphatic defect(s) or permanent diversion of lymphatic fluid away from lymphatic defect(s). Decreased production of lymphatic fluid may be accomplished by dietary restriction (or complete replacement of oral intake with total parenteral nutrition), as well as by the medications octreotide (a synthetic analogue of the hormone somatostatin) and orlistat (a lipase inhibitor that decreases absorption of dietary fats). Permanent diversion of lymphatic fluid may be accomplished by thoracic duct embolization (a needle-based procedure to occlude the duct by depositing glue/embolic material into it) or by thoracic duct ligation (an open surgical procedure to occlude the duct by suturing tightly around it).

== See also ==
- Chyme
