= Lymph capillary =

Microvessel serving to drain and process extracellular fluid

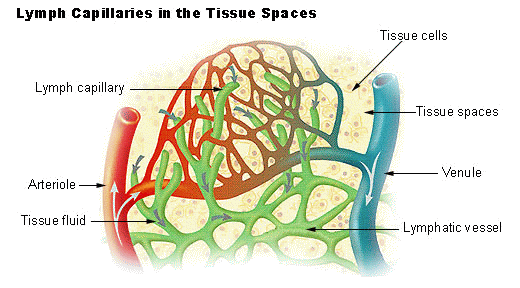
- Diagram showing the formation of lymph from interstitial fluid (labeled here as "Tissue fluid")

Details
- System: Lymphatic system

Identifiers
- Latin: vas lymphocapillare
- TA98: A12.0.00.044
- TA2: 3918
- TH: H3.09.02.0.05004
- FMA: 5028

Lymph capillaries or lymphatic capillaries are tiny, thin-walled microvessels located in the spaces between cells (except in the central nervous system and non-vascular tissues) which serve to drain and process extracellular fluid. Upon entering the lumen of a lymphatic capillary, the collected fluid is known as lymph. Each lymphatic capillary carries lymph into a lymphatic vessel, which in turn connects to a lymph node, a small bean-shaped gland that filters and monitors the lymphatic fluid for infections. Lymph is ultimately returned to the venous circulation.

Lymphatic capillaries are slightly larger in diameter than blood capillaries, and have closed ends (unlike the loop structure of blood capillaries). Lymph capillaries are dispersed among the blood-related capillaries providing efficient and effective uptake from the interstitial fluid during capillary exchange. This distribuiton allows for a rapid and continuous collection. Their unique structure permits interstitial fluid to flow into them but not out. The ends of the endothelial cells that make up the wall of a lymphatic capillary overlap. When pressure is greater in the interstitial fluid than in lymph, the cells separate slightly, like the opening of a one-way swinging door, and interstitial fluid enters the lymphatic capillary. When pressure is greater inside the lymphatic capillary, the cells adhere more closely, and lymph cannot escape back into the interstitial fluid. Attached to the lymphatic capillaries are anchoring filaments, which contain elastic fibers. They extend out from the lymphatic capillary, attaching lymphatic endothelial cells to surrounding tissues. When excess interstitial fluid accumulates and causes tissue swelling, the anchoring filaments are pulled, making the openings between cells even larger so that more fluid can flow into the lymphatic capillary.

Lymph capillaries have a greater internal oncotic pressure than blood capillaries, due to the greater concentration of plasma proteins present.

== Clinical importance ==
In the small intestine, lymphatic capillaries called lacteals are critical for the transport of dietary lipids and lipid-soluble vitamins to the bloodstream. In the small intestine, dietary triglycerides combine with other lipids and proteins, and enter the lacteals to form a milky fluid called chyle. The chyle then travels through the lymphatic system, eventually entering the bloodstream.
