= Starling equation =

Mathematical description of fluid movements

The Starling principle holds that fluid movement across a semi-permeable blood vessel such as a capillary or small venule is determined by the hydrostatic pressures and colloid osmotic pressures (oncotic pressure) on either side of a semipermeable barrier that sieves the filtrate, retarding larger molecules such as proteins from leaving the blood stream. As all blood vessels allow a degree of protein leak, true equilibrium across the membrane cannot occur and there is a continuous flow of water with small solutes. The molecular sieving properties of the capillary wall reside in a recently discovered endocapillary layer rather than in the dimensions of pores through or between the endothelial cells. This fibre matrix endocapillary layer is called the endothelial glycocalyx. The Starling equation describes that relationship in mathematical form and can be applied to many biological and non-biological semipermeable membranes.

== The equation ==
The Starling equation as applied to a blood vessel wall reads as

$$\ J_v = L_\mathrm{p} S ( [P_\mathrm{c} - P_\mathrm{i}] - \sigma[\pi_\mathrm{p} - \pi_\mathrm{g}] )$$

where:

- $J_v$ is the trans endothelial solvent filtration volume per second.
- $L_p$ is the hydraulic conductivity of the membrane
- $S$ is the surface area for filtration, determined by gaps in the "tight junction" glue that binds endothelial cells at their edges.
- $[P_\mathrm{c} - P_\mathrm{i}] - \sigma[\pi_\mathrm{p} - \pi_\mathrm{g}]$ is the net driving force,
  - $P_c$ is the capillary hydrostatic pressure
  - $P_i$ is the interstitial hydrostatic pressure
  - $\pi_p$ is the plasma protein oncotic pressure
  - $\pi_g$ is the subglycocalyx oncotic pressure, which varies inversely with $J_v$ and so stabilises $J_v$.
  - $\sigma$ is Staverman's reflection coefficient, determined by the condition of the endothelial glycocalyx over the junction gaps.

Pressures are customarily measured in millimetres of mercury (mmHg), and the filtration coefficient in millilitres per minute per millimetre of mercury (ml·min^{−1}·mmHg^{−1}).

The rate at which fluid is filtered across vascular endothelium (transendothelial filtration) is determined by the sum of two outward forces, capillary pressure ($P_c$) and colloid osmotic pressure beneath the endothelial glycocalyx ($\pi_g$), and two absorptive forces, plasma protein osmotic pressure ($\pi_p$) and interstitial pressure ($P_i$). The Starling equation is the first of two Kedem–Katchalski equations which bring nonsteady state thermodynamics to the theory of osmotic pressure across membranes that are at least partly permeable to the solute responsible for the osmotic pressure difference. The second Kedem–Katchalsky equation explains the trans endothelial transport of solutes, $J_s$.

It is now known that the average colloid osmotic pressure of the interstitial fluid has no effect on $J_v$. The colloid osmotic pressure difference that opposes filtration is now known to be $\pi_p$ minus the subglycocalyx $\pi_g$.The subglycocalyx space is a very small but vitally important micro domain of the total interstitial fluid space. The concentration of soluble proteins in that microdomain, which determines $\pi_g$, is close to zero while there is adequate filtration to flush them out of the interendothelial clefts. For this reason $J_v$ is much less than previously calculated and is tightly regulated . Any transient rise in plasma colloid osmotic pressure or fall in capillary hydrostatic pressure sufficient to allow reverse (negative) $J_v$ causes unopposed diffusion of interstitial proteins to the subglycocalyx space, reducing the colloid osmotic pressure difference that was driving absorption of fluid to the capillary. The dependence of $\pi_g$ upon the local $J_v$ has been called The Glycocalyx Model or the Michel-Weinbaum model, in honour of two scientists who, independently, described the filtration function of the glycocalyx. The Michel-Weinbaum Model explains how most continuous capillaries are in a steady state of filtration along their entire length most of the time. Transient disturbances of the Starling forces return rapidly to steady state filtration.

=== Filtration coefficient ===
In some texts the product of hydraulic conductivity and surface area is called the filtration co-efficient K_{fc}.

=== Reflection coefficient ===
Staverman's reflection coefficient, σ, is a unitless constant that is specific to the permeability of a membrane to a given solute.

The Starling equation, written without σ, describes the flow of a solvent across a membrane that is impermeable to the solutes contained within the solution.

σ_{n} corrects for the partial permeability of a semipermeable membrane to a solute n.

Where σ is close to 1, the plasma membrane is less permeable to the denotated species (for example, larger molecules such as albumin and other plasma proteins), which may flow across the endothelial lining, from higher to lower concentrations, more slowly, while allowing water and smaller solutes through the glycocalyx filter to the extravascular space.

- Glomerular capillaries have a reflection coefficient close to 1 as normally no protein crosses into the glomerular filtrate.
- In contrast, hepatic sinusoids have no reflection coefficient as they are fully permeable to protein. Hepatic interstitial fluid within the Space of Diss has the same colloid osmotic pressure as plasma and so hepatocyte synthesis of albumin can be regulated.

=== Approximate values ===
Following are typical values for the variables in the Starling equation which regulate net $J_v$ to about 0.1ml per second, 5-6 ml per minute or about 8 litres per day.

Location	P_{c} (mmHg)	P_{i} (mmHg)	σπ_{c} (mmHg)	σπ_{g} (mmHg)
arteriolar end of capillary	+35	−2	+28	depends on local $J_v$
venule	+15	−2	+28	depends on local $J_v$

== Specific organs ==
=== Kidneys ===
Glomerular capillaries have a continuous glycocalyx layer in health and the total transendothelial filtration rate of solvent ($J_v$) to the renal tubules is normally around 125 ml/ min (about 180 litres/ day). Glomerular capillary $J_v$ is more familiarly known as the glomerular filtration rate (GFR).

=== Lungs ===
The Starling equation can describe the movement of fluid from pulmonary capillaries to the alveolar air space.

== Clinical significance ==
Woodcock and Woodcock showed in 2012 that the revised Starling equation (steady-state Starling principle) provides scientific explanations for clinical observations concerning intravenous fluid therapy. Traditional teaching of both filtration and absorption of fluid occurring in a single capillary has been superseded by the concept of a vital circulation of extracellular interstitial fluid running parallel to the circulation of blood. Infusing intravenous fluids that raise plasma colloid osmotic pressure (colloid therapy) has much less effect on plasma volume than originally expected, in part because the initially reduced filtration rate allows the concentration of proteins in the subglycocalx spaces to rise, returning the colloid osmotic pressure difference and trans endothelial solvent filtration rate to their steady state levels within an hour. Prevention and treatment of oedema (excess interstitial fluid) depends on normalisation of $P_c$ and optimisation of the flow rate of lymph.

== History ==
The Starling equation is named for the British physiologist Ernest Starling, who is also recognised for the Frank–Starling law of the heart. Starling can be credited with identifying that the "absorption of isotonic salt solutions (from the extravascular space) by the blood vessels is determined by this osmotic pressure of the serum proteins" in 1896.

== See also ==
- Renal function
