= Body fluid =

Liquids inside of the body, sometimes excreted or secreted

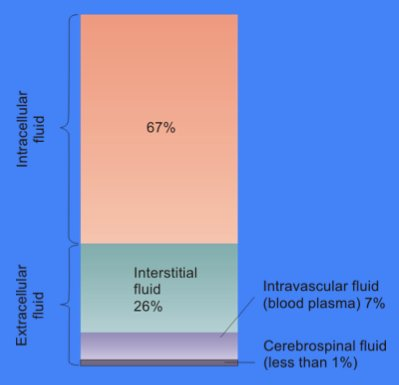
Intracellular and extracellular fluid compartments. The extracellular fluid compartment is further subdivided into the interstitial fluid and the intravascular fluid compartments.

Body fluids, bodily fluids, or biofluids, sometimes body liquids, are liquids within the body of an organism. In lean healthy adult men, the total body water is about 60% (60–67%) of the total body weight; it is usually slightly lower in women (52–55%). The exact percentage of fluid relative to body weight is inversely proportional to the percentage of body fat. A lean 70 kg (150 lb) man, for example, has about 42 (42–47) liters of water in his body.

The total body of water is divided into fluid compartments, between the intracellular fluid compartment (also called space, or volume) and the extracellular fluid (ECF) compartment (space, volume) in a two-to-one ratio: 28 (28–32) liters are inside cells and 14 (14–15) liters are outside cells.

The ECF compartment is divided into the interstitial fluid volume – the fluid outside both the cells and the blood vessels – and the intravascular volume (also called the vascular volume and blood plasma volume) – the fluid inside the blood vessels – in a three-to-one ratio: the interstitial fluid volume is about 12 liters; the vascular volume is about 4 liters.

The interstitial fluid compartment is divided into the lymphatic fluid compartment – about 2/3, or 8 (6–10) liters, and the transcellular fluid compartment (the remaining 1/3, or about 4 liters).

The vascular volume is divided into the venous volume and the arterial volume; and the arterial volume has a conceptually useful but unmeasurable subcompartment called the effective arterial blood volume.

== Compartments by location ==
- intracellular fluid (ICF), which consist of cytosol and fluids in the cell nucleus
- Extracellular fluid
  - Intravascular fluid (blood plasma)
  - Interstitial fluid
  - Lymphatic fluid (sometimes included in interstitial fluid)
  - Transcellular fluid

== Health ==
=== Clinical samples ===
Clinical samples are generally defined as non-infectious human or animal materials including blood, saliva, excreta, body tissue and tissue fluids, and also FDA-approved pharmaceuticals that are blood products. In medical contexts, it is a specimen taken for diagnostic examination or evaluation, and for identification of disease or condition.

== See also ==
- Basic reproduction number
- Blood-borne diseases
- Biofluid dynamics
- Clinical pathology
- Humorism
- Hygiene
- Ritual cleanliness
