= CFAP97D2 =

Protein found in humans

Identifiers
- Aliases: CFAP97D2, uncharacterized protein C17orf105 homolog, CFAP97 domain containing 2
- External IDs: MGI: 2685952; GeneCards: CFAP97D2

Gene location (Human)
Chr.	Chromosome 13 (human)
Band	13q34	Start	114,154,691 bp
Band	13q34	End	114,223,084 bp

Gene location (Mouse)
Chr.	Chromosome 8 (mouse)
Band	8|8 A1.1	Start	13,755,889 bp
Band	8|8 A1.1	End	13,793,414 bp
RNA expression pattern
Bgee	Human / Mouse (ortholog); Top expressed in: right uterine tube; granulocyte; testicle; body of pancreas; olfactory zone of nasal mucosa; right testis; gonad; left testis; caudate nucleus; hypothalamus / Top expressed in: hypothalamus; rib; spermatocyte; mandible; dentate gyrus of hippocampal formation granule cell; cerebellar cortex; olfactory bulb; hippocampus proper; lesser wing of sphenoid bone; zygote; More reference expression data
BioGPS	n/a
Orthologs
Databases	NCBI: entry; OMA: entry
Species	Human	Mouse
Entrez	101929355	403185
Ensembl	ENSG00000283361	ENSMUSG00000090336
UniProt	A0A1B0GU71	G3UW36
RefSeq (mRNA)	NM_001395229; NM_001395230	NM_001101519
RefSeq (protein)	XP_016876399	NP_001094989
Location (UCSC)	Chr 13: 114.15 – 114.22 Mb	Chr 8: 13.76 – 13.79 Mb
PubMed search
- Wikidata
View/Edit Human	View/Edit Mouse

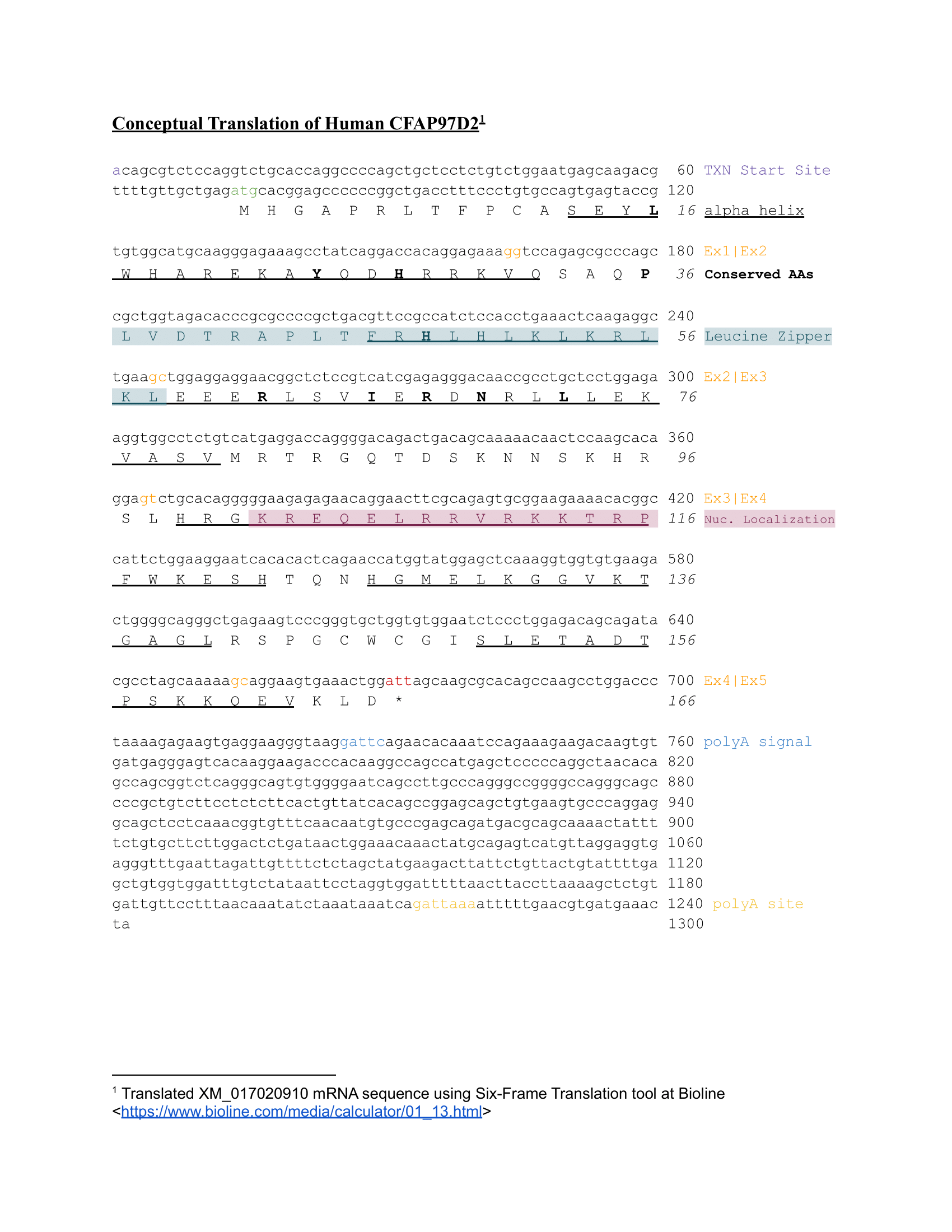
Conceptual Translation of Homo sapiens CFAP97D2

CFAP97D2 (Cilia and Flagella Associated Protein 97 Domain containing 2) is a protein that in humans is encoded by the CFAP97D2 gene.

== Gene ==
Homo sapiens CFAP97D2 gene (XM_017020910.2) is a 68,395 base pair gene that encodes mRNA transcripts ranging from 952 nucleotides to 1841 nucleotides. It is located on Chromosome 13 and found at locus 13q34 on the plus strand. CFAP97D2 is on Chromosome 13. This gene encodes 166 amino acids that make up Cilia and Flagella Associated Protein 97 containing Domain 2 (CFAP97D2) protein. The CFAP97D2 gene is also known as C17orf105 Homolog gene.

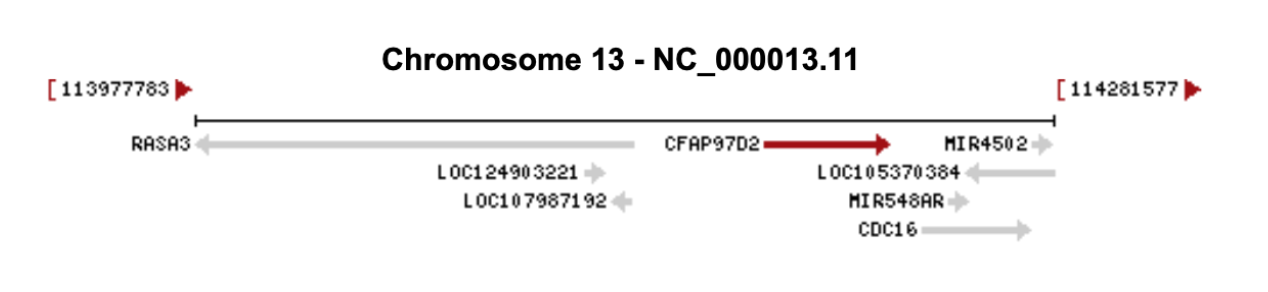
CFAP97D2 Gene Neighborhood

== mRNA ==
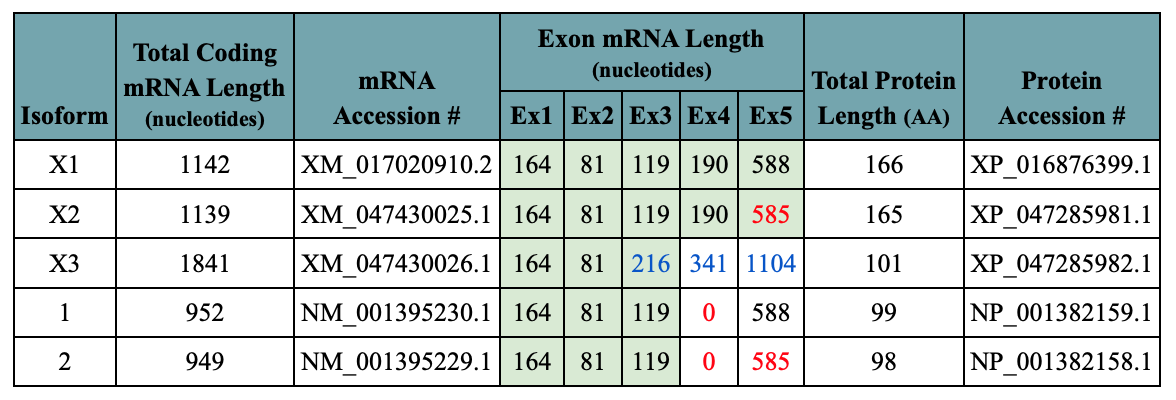
Homo sapiens CFAP97D2 Isoforms

=== Isoforms ===
There are 5 mRNA transcripts produced from the CFAP97D2 gene. These transcripts encode 5 different CFAP97D2 isoforms: X1, X2, X3, 1, and 2. Isoform X1 is 166 AA, the longest isoform of Homo sapiens CFAP97D2. Isoform X2 has 2 deleterious mRNA mutations at the end of exon 5 accounting for a single amino acid deletion. The final protein transcript is a 165 amino acids. Isoform X3 has numerous mRNA insertions in Exons 3, 4, and 5. The final protein length is 101 AA. Isoforms 1 and 2 have complete deleterious mRNA mutations of Exon 4 and encode final protein lengths of 99 and 98 AA respectively.

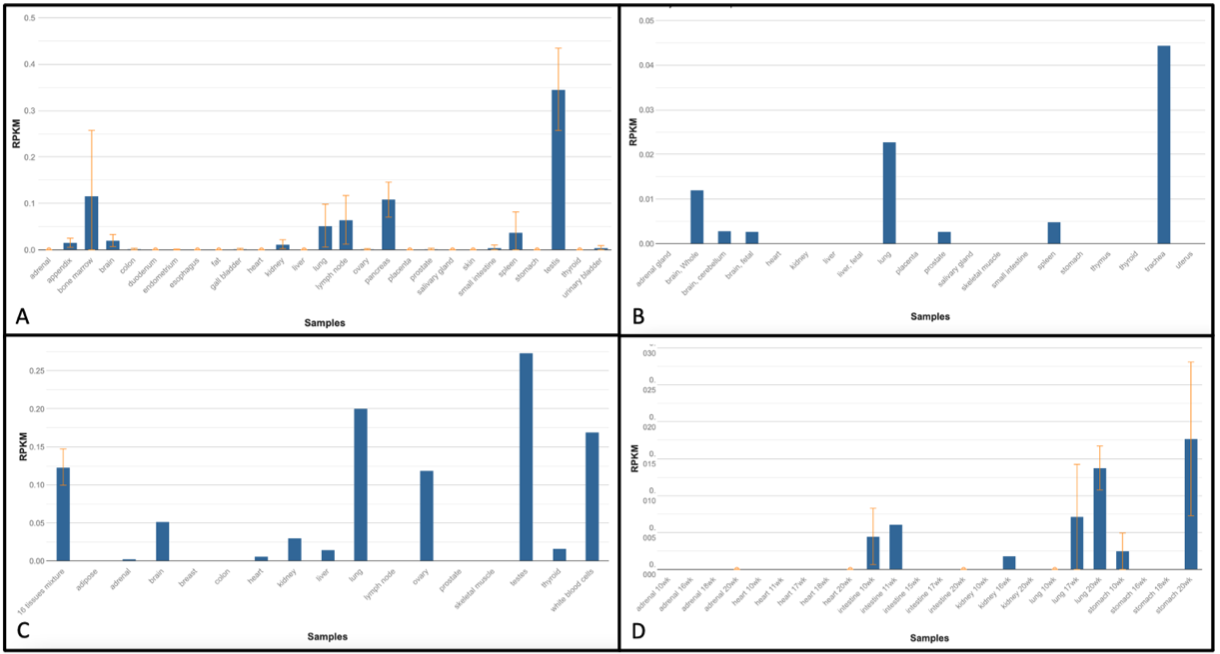
NCBI CFAP97D2 RNA Tissue Expression

=== Expression ===
RNA sequencing revealed CFAP97D2 expression in the brain, lungs, pancreas, testis, fallopian tubes, and cervix.

== Protein ==
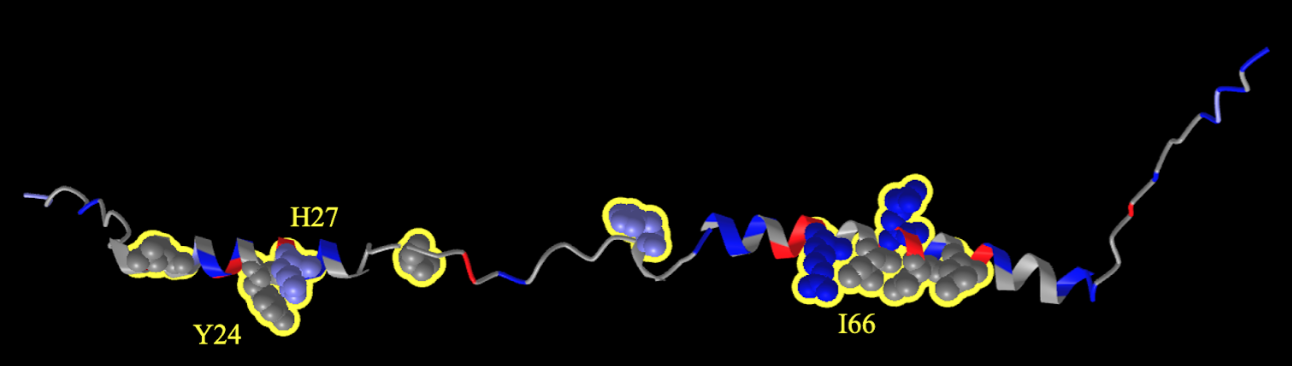
Homo sapiens CFAP97D2 Isoform X1 Tertiary Structure

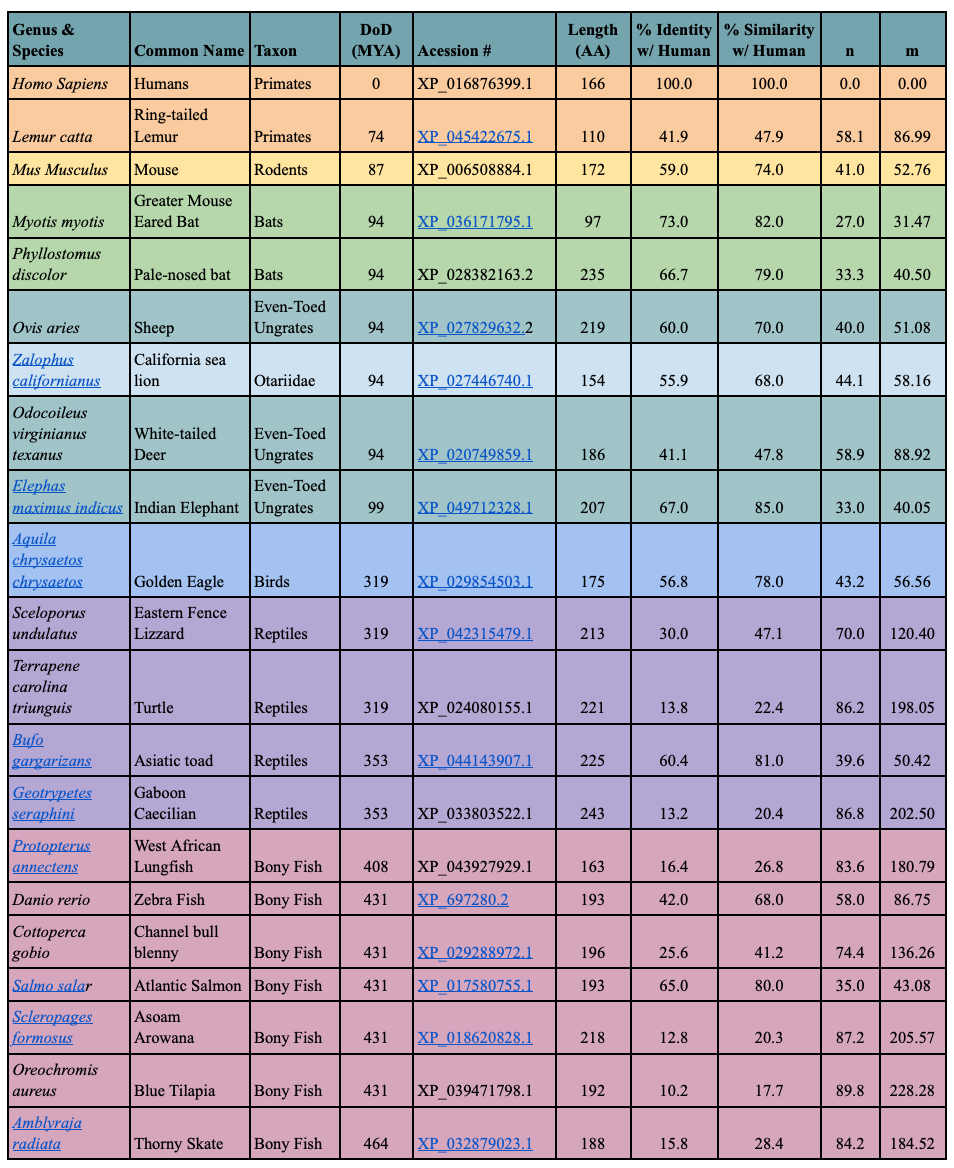
CFAP97D2 Strict Orthologs

=== Primary structure ===
Homo sapiens CFAP97D2 Isoform X1 is a basic protein with a predicted PI of 10.4 and Mw 19.3 kaD. There is nuclear leucine zipper motif (AA #37-52) and nuclear localization signal (AA #102-116).

=== Secondary structure ===
By definition, the leucine zipper region of Homo sapiens CFAP97D2 (AA #37-52) is an alpha helix.

=== Tertiary structure ===
CFAP97D2 is characterized by coiled-coiled regions and 2 alpha helices

== Homology ==
=== CFAP97 gene family ===
The CFAP97 gene family contains 3 genes: CFAP97, CFAP97D1, and CFAP97D2 and is characterized by the KIAA1430 gene domain. CFAP97D1 has longer evolutionary conservation than CFAP97D2 with an estimated date of divergence 431 MYA.

==== Strict orthologs ====
CFAP97D2 is a highly conserved protein found in primates, rodents, bats, even-toed ungulates, otarlidae, birds, reptiles, and bony fish. Primate and rodent CFAP97D2 proteins are most recently related (% identity range: 74-100%). Bats, even-toed ungulates, otariidae, and birds are moderately related to Homo sapiens CFAP97D2 (% identity range: 55.9-73%) and reptile and body fish species are most distantly related (% identity range: 25.6-42%). The asiactic toad is an outlier as a reptile with 60.4% identity with Homo sapiens CFAP97D2.

==== Paralogs and distant homologs ====
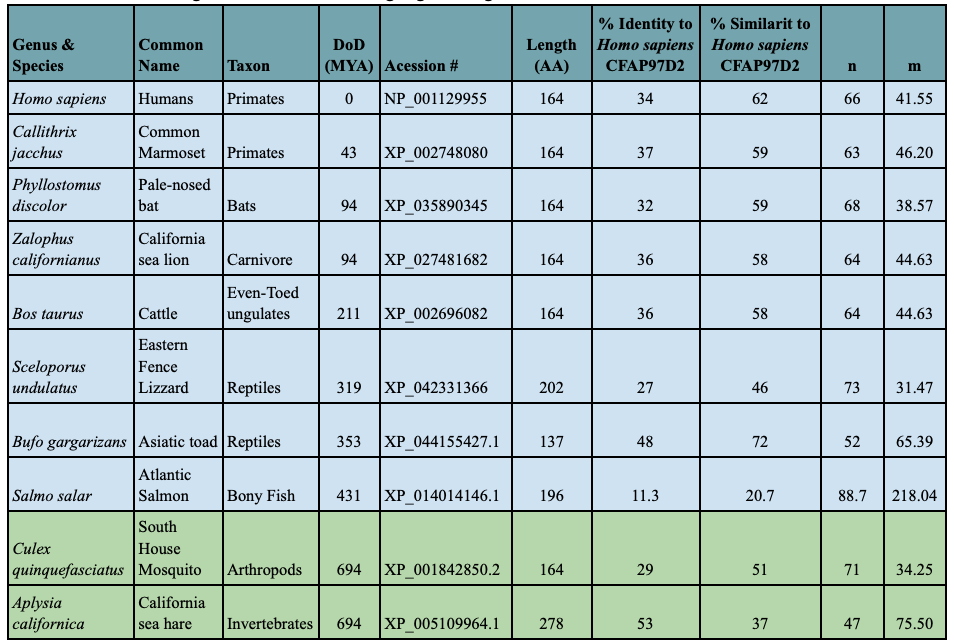
Homo sapiens CFAP97D2 Paralog and Distant Homolog Table

CFAP97D1 is conserved in both invertebrate and vertebrate species. The CFAP97D1 genes found in vertebrate species are paralogs of CFAP97D2. The invertebrate CFAP97D1 genes existing prior to 431 MYA are distant CFAP97D2 homologs due to these paralogs' shared evolutionary history.

==== Evolution ====
CFAP97D1 has longer evolutionary conservation than CFAP97D2. CFAP97D1's slow and consistent conservation is evidenced by its little divergence from its ortholog ancestors over 600 million years while CFAP97D2 has changed rapidly over 431 million years. Present only in vertebrate species, CFAP97D2's rapid evolution indicates that it is under different selective pressures than CFAP97D1 and therefore serves in a different functional capacity.

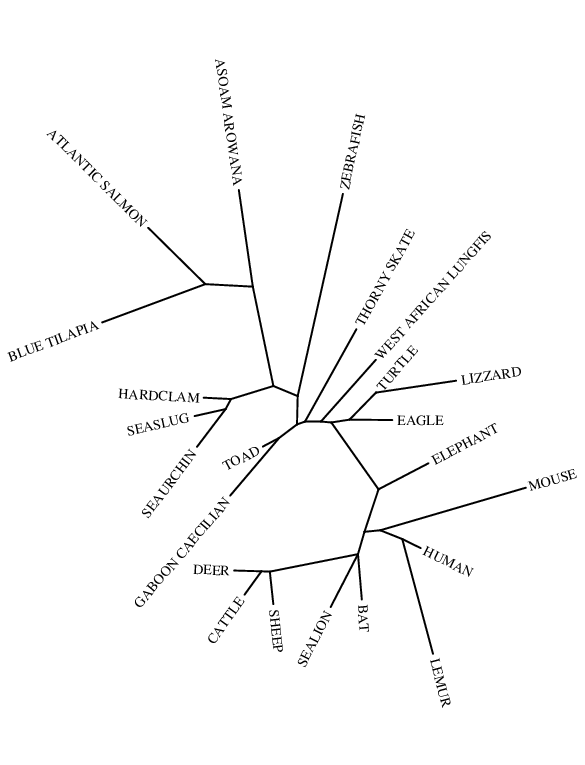
CFAP97D2 Phylogenetic Tree
