= ACTA2 =

Protein-coding gene in the species Homo sapiens

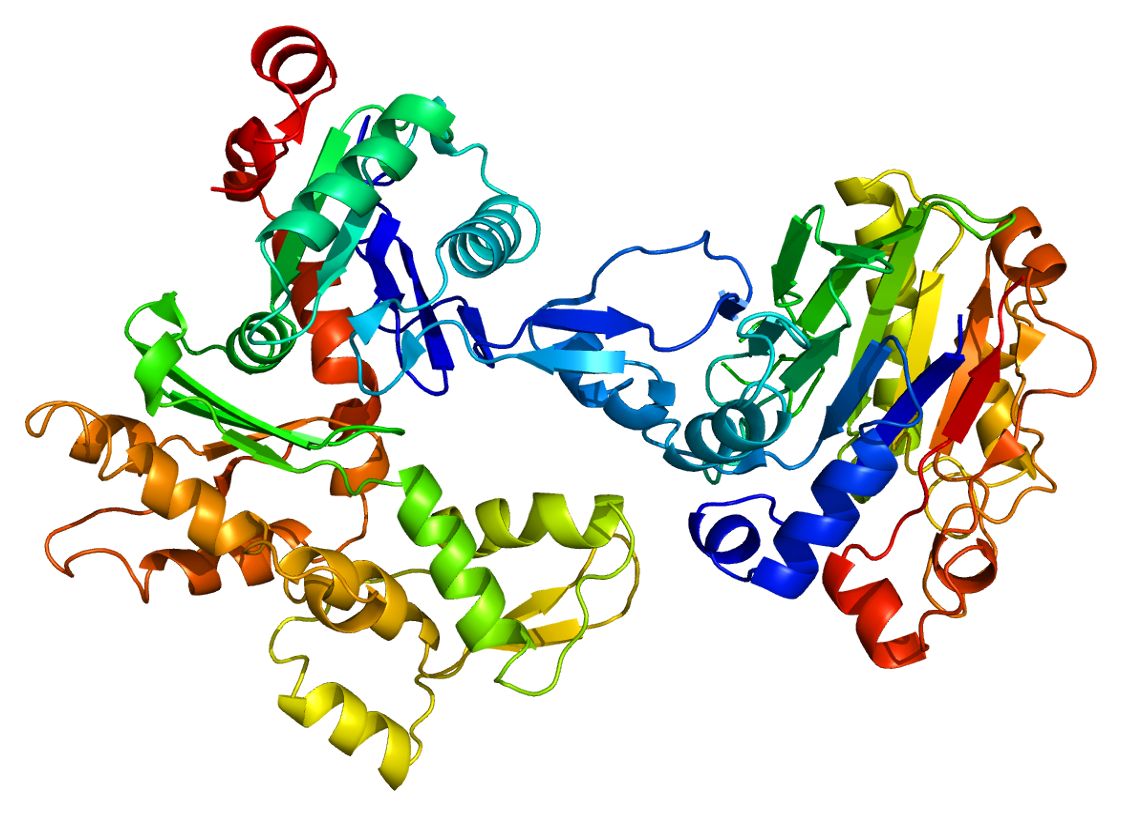

Identifiers
- Aliases: ACTA2, AAT6, ACTSA, MYMY5, actin, alpha 2, smooth muscle, aorta, actin alpha 2, smooth muscle
- External IDs: OMIM: 102620; MGI: 87909; GeneCards: ACTA2

Gene location (Human)
Chr.	Chromosome 10 (human)
Band	10q23.31	Start	88,935,074 bp
Band	10q23.31	End	88,991,339 bp

Gene location (Mouse)
Chr.	Chromosome 19 (mouse)
Band	19|19 C1	Start	34,218,490 bp
Band	19|19 C1	End	34,232,990 bp
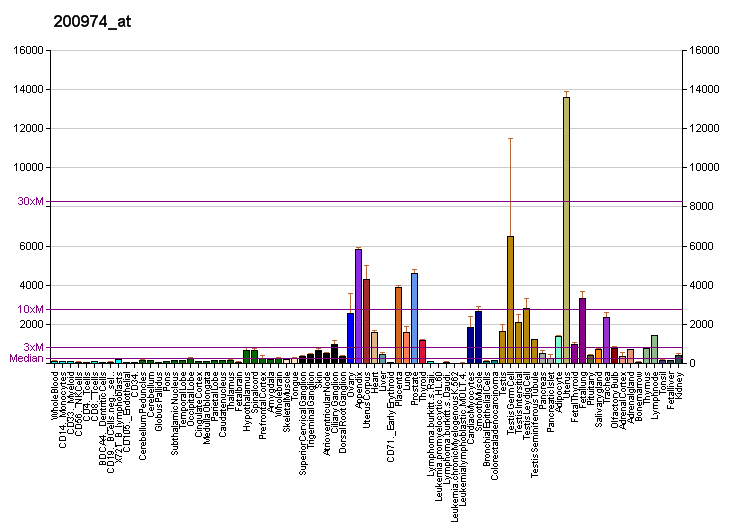
RNA expression pattern
Bgee	Human / Mouse (ortholog); Top expressed in: saphenous vein; tail of epididymis; right coronary artery; popliteal artery; tibial arteries; urethra; ascending aorta; seminal vesicula; body of uterus; Descending thoracic aorta / Top expressed in: ascending aorta; tunica media of zone of aorta; aortic valve; iris; umbilical cord; cervix; calvaria; migratory enteric neural crest cell; internal carotid artery; seminal vesicula; More reference expression data
BioGPS	More reference expression data
Gene ontology
Molecular function	ATP binding; nucleotide binding; protein kinase binding
Cellular component	cytosol; cytoplasm; actin cytoskeleton; smooth muscle contractile fiber; cell body; lamellipodium; filopodium; cytoskeleton; extracellular exosome; extracellular space; protein-containing complex
Biological process	muscle contraction; regulation of blood pressure; vascular associated smooth muscle contraction; mesenchyme migration; positive regulation of gene expression; glomerular mesangial cell development; response to virus; positive regulation of transcription, DNA-templated
Sources:Amigo / QuickGO
Orthologs
Databases	NCBI: entry; OMA: entry
Species	Human	Mouse
Entrez	59	11475
Ensembl	ENSG00000107796	ENSMUSG00000035783
UniProt	P62736	P62737
RefSeq (mRNA)	NM_001141945; NM_001613; NM_001320855	NM_007392
RefSeq (protein)	NP_001135417; NP_001307784; NP_001604	NP_031418
Location (UCSC)	Chr 10: 88.94 – 88.99 Mb	Chr 19: 34.22 – 34.23 Mb
PubMed search
- Wikidata
View/Edit Human	View/Edit Mouse

ACTA2 (actin alpha 2) is an actin protein with several aliases including alpha-actin, alpha-actin-2, aortic smooth muscle or alpha smooth muscle actin (α-SMA, SMactin, alpha-SM-actin, ASMA). Actins are a family of globular multi-functional proteins that form microfilaments. ACTA2 is one of six different actin isoforms and is involved in the contractile apparatus of smooth muscle. ACTA2 (as with all the actins) is extremely highly conserved and found in nearly all mammals.

In humans, ACTA2 is encoded by the ACTA2 gene located on 10q22-q24. Mutations in this gene cause a variety of vascular diseases, such as thoracic aortic disease, coronary artery disease, stroke, Moyamoya disease, and multisystemic smooth muscle dysfunction syndrome.

ACTA2 (commonly referred to as alpha-smooth muscle actin or α-SMA) is often used as a marker of myofibroblast formation. Studies have shown that ACTA2 is associated with TGF-β pathway that enhances contractile properties of hepatic stellate cells leading to liver fibrosis and cirrhosis.
