= Calponin =

Calcium binding protein

Calponin Homology Domain
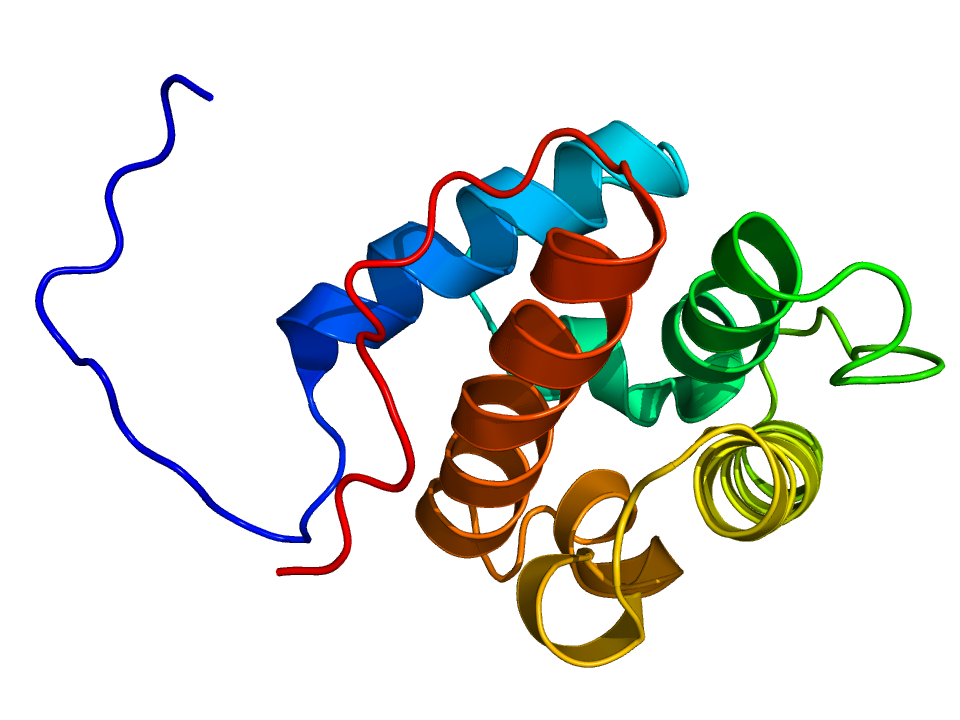
- CH domain from H.Sapiends Calponin 1. PDB 1wyp

Identifiers
- Symbol: CH
- Pfam: PF00307
- Pfam clan: CL0188
- InterPro: IPR001715
Available protein structures:
- PDB: IPR001715 PF00307 (ECOD; PDBsum)
- AlphaFold: IPR001715; PF00307

calponin 1, basic, smooth muscle
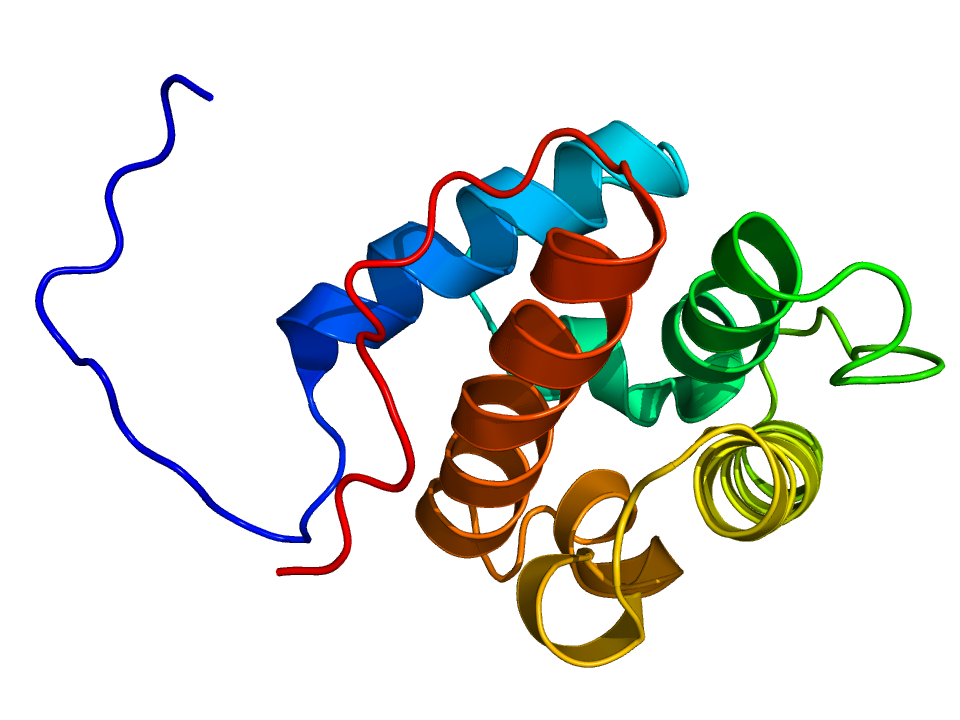
- Solution structure of the CH domain of human Calponin 1. Rainbow colored cartoon (N-terminus = blue, C-terminus = red).

Identifiers
- Symbol: CNN1
- NCBI gene: 1264
- HGNC: 2155
- OMIM: 600806
- PDB: 1WYP
- RefSeq: NM_001299
- UniProt: P51911

Other data
- Locus: Chr. 19 p13.2-13.1
Search for
- Structures: Swiss-model
- Domains: InterPro

calponin 2

Identifiers
- Symbol: CNN2
- NCBI gene: 1265
- HGNC: 2156
- OMIM: 602373
- RefSeq: NM_004368
- UniProt: Q99439

Other data
- Locus: Chr. 19 p13.3
Search for
- Structures: Swiss-model
- Domains: InterPro

calponin 3, acidic

Identifiers
- Symbol: CNN3
- NCBI gene: 1266
- HGNC: 2157
- OMIM: 602374
- RefSeq: NM_001839
- UniProt: Q6FHA7

Other data
- Locus: Chr. 1 p22-p21
Search for
- Structures: Swiss-model
- Domains: InterPro

Calponin is an actin binding protein that is involved in regulation of smooth muscle contraction and cytoskeletal establishment. Calponin was first identified in smooth muscle from chicken gizzard which was later characterized as an actin associated filament protein with around 300 amino acids. Calponin functions as a calcium binding protein that inhibits ATPase activity of myosin in smooth muscle. Phosphorylation of calponin by a protein kinase releases this inhibition of the smooth muscle ATPase, which is depended on calcium binding calmodulin.

cDNA cloning has determined many isoforms of calponin including calponin 1, calponin 2, and calponin 3. Which has left to many studies of calponin 1 in smooth muscles. Calponin adjusts actomyosin ATPase activity and creates an influence in the production of contractile force in smooth muscle cells. Although it has much involvement in smooth muscle tissue, calponin is also involved in cellular signaling pathways related to calcium and ERK activation.

== Isoforms ==
Calponin has three isoforms that are encoded by separate genes:

- Calponin 1 (basic)
- Calponin 2 (neutral)
- Calponin 3 (acidic)

Calponin isoform 1 (CNN1) is the most studied out of the three. It is specific to differentiated smooth muscle cells and play a major role in regulating smooth muscle contraction. Its expression is often used as a marker to identify smooth muscle cells in research.

Calponin isoform 2 (CNN2) differs as it is found in both smooth muscle and non-muscle cells. It is involved in cytoskeletal organization and has had linked to macrophage function and cardiovascular disease. Significant amounts of CNN2 are also found in platelets, where it plays a role in facilitating cell adhesion. Studies have shown that CNN2 expression is regulated by mechanical tension in the cytoskeleton, with higher levels found in cells under greater mechanical stress.

Calponin isoform 3 (CNN3) is the least studied. It is not restricted to smooth muscle and is instead seen in non-muscle cells including those found in the brain. CNN3 also participates in actin cytoskeleton based activities in embryonic development and myogenesis. Systemic knockout of CNN3 in mice results in embryonic and neonatal lethality due to defects in development of the central nervous system, which is consistent with the important role of the neural tissue. This stands in contrast to CNN1 and CNN2 knockouts, where mice remain viable and fertile.

All three of these isoforms that were determined by cDNA cloning differ in their binding modes. There are two regions of calponin that have a similar binding site on actin, which results in the modes of interaction and how calponin acts. This helps explain the layers and distinct cellular functions. CNN1 plays a role in vascular smooth muscle through its inhibition that is caused by the molecular response of ERK activation and decreasing of calcium sensitization. Making calponin more complex and having roles much more complex than regular contraction. Calponin 3 (CNN3) participates in actin cytoskeleton activities that occur during myogenesis. This makes calponin 3's role bigger than just the involvement in the nervous system.

== Structure ==
Cross-section of a chicken gizzard, a smooth muscle tissue where calponin was first identified.

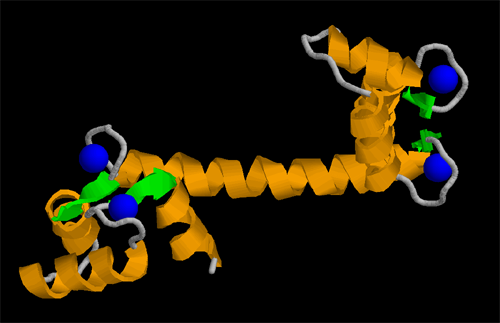
Calcium-bound calmodulin showing Ca^{2+} ion (blue) bound to EF-hand motifs, which regulate proteins such as calponin in smooth muscle.

Calponin is mainly made up of α-helices with hydrogen bond turns. It is a binding protein and is made up of three domains. These domains in order of appearance are calponin homology (CH), regulatory domain (RD), and click-23, domain that contains the calponin repeats. At the CH domain calponin binds to α-actin and filamin and binds to actin within the RD domain. Calmodulin, when activated by calcium may bind weakly to the CH domain and inhibit calponin binding with α-actin.

Its highly conserved core structure consists of a calponin homology domain, two actin-binding motifs, and three calponin like repeats. The three isoforms are conserved in their N-terminal and middle regions but have diverged in their C-terminal segment, which explains the charge differences.

== Function ==
Calponin is responsible for binding many actin binding proteins, phospholipids, and regulates the actin/myosin interaction. Calponin is also thought to negatively affect the bone making process due to being expressed in high amounts in osteoblasts.

Calponin 1 (CNN1) also plays a role in cellular signaling by acting as a scaffold that links protein kinase C, Raf, MEK, and ERK together, which promotes protein kinase C dependant ERK activation in smooth muscle cells. Research using calponin 1 in mice found that calponin 1 (CNN1) has a negative impact on regulation in calcium sensitization, meaning without CNN1, smooth muscle cells maintain contractile tone for a longer duration. Beyond smooth muscle, calponin also plays a role in non-muscle cell motility including processes like cell adhesion, migration, proliferation, phagocytosis, wound healing, and inflammatory responses.

Phosphorylation plays a major role in regulating calponin function. The primary phosphorylation sites in calponin 1 are located at specific residues such as Ser175 and Thr184 in the second actin-binding site. These residues are phosphorylated by the protein kinase C, and this phosphorylation alters the molecular confirmation of calponin which causing it to dissociate from actin filaments. The result of this is a release of the inhibition of actomyosin ATPase activity and an increase in force production. These phosphorylation sites are conserved across all three calponin isoforms, proposing a shared regulatory mechanism.

Calponin proteins are also important during development and tissue remodeling. During embryonic development, they help regulate cytoskeletal organization and cell differentiation. Calponin 3 (CNN3) is important for proper development of the nervous system, as knockout studies in mice have show sever development defects and early death.

In adult tissues, calponin is involved in wound healing and repair. It helps control cell movement and contraction, which are necessary for closing wounds. Calponin also plays a role in inflammatory responses. For example, CNN2 in macrophages affects how these cells migrate and perform phagocytosis, linking cytoskeletal function to immune activity.

== Regulation ==
Calponin isoforms are regulated at both the transcriptional and post-translational level and this allows cells to adapt to many different conditions, In smooth muscle cells, calponin 1 is mainly expressed in the contractile differential state. When these cells travel to a more proliferative phenotype, like a disease or injury, calponin 1 expression levels are lower. This shows that calponin is not only important for contraction but also for maintaining smooth muscle cells to a regular condition.

Calponin 2 (CNN2) has been shown to increase in cells that are under higher mechanical tension, which shows that calponin plays a role in mechanotransduction, where cells convert physical forces into biochemical signals. Due to this, calponin helps cells respond to alterations in their environments and even in blood-vessels.

Other post-transitional modifications can affect calponin function, including tyrosine phosphorylation, like MEKK1 phosphorylation, or even methylation. These changes can change the structure and affinity of it binding to actin and other proteins, providing another way for the cell to organize cytoskeletal structure and activity of contraction.

== Clinical significance ==
=== Cardiovascular disease ===
Calponin isoform 2 (CNN2) is expressed at meaningful levels in macrophages. Removing it has shown a change in macrophage phagocytosis and migration. Studies in mouse models demonstrated the removal of CNN2 from macrophages reduces the development of atherosclerotic lesions. Deletion of the CNN2 gene in a study showed decrease of calcification of the aortic valve in an established mouse model of calcific aortic valve disease, which pointed to CNN2 and is an early step in Calcific aortic valve disease development.

=== As intervention point ===
Calponin has been studied as therapeutic target. In cancer, calponin 1 plays a difficult role that is complex that is reduced in some tumor types such as leiomyosarcoma, and higher in others. Restoring its expression in certain cancer cell lines has been shown to reduce tumor progression, which supports the idea of its possibilities of being an intervention point.

Removing CNN2 in mouse models from similar studies has shown to reduce atherosclerosis and decrease calcification in the aortic valve, which supports the idea that targeting these calponin pathways can lead to treatments.

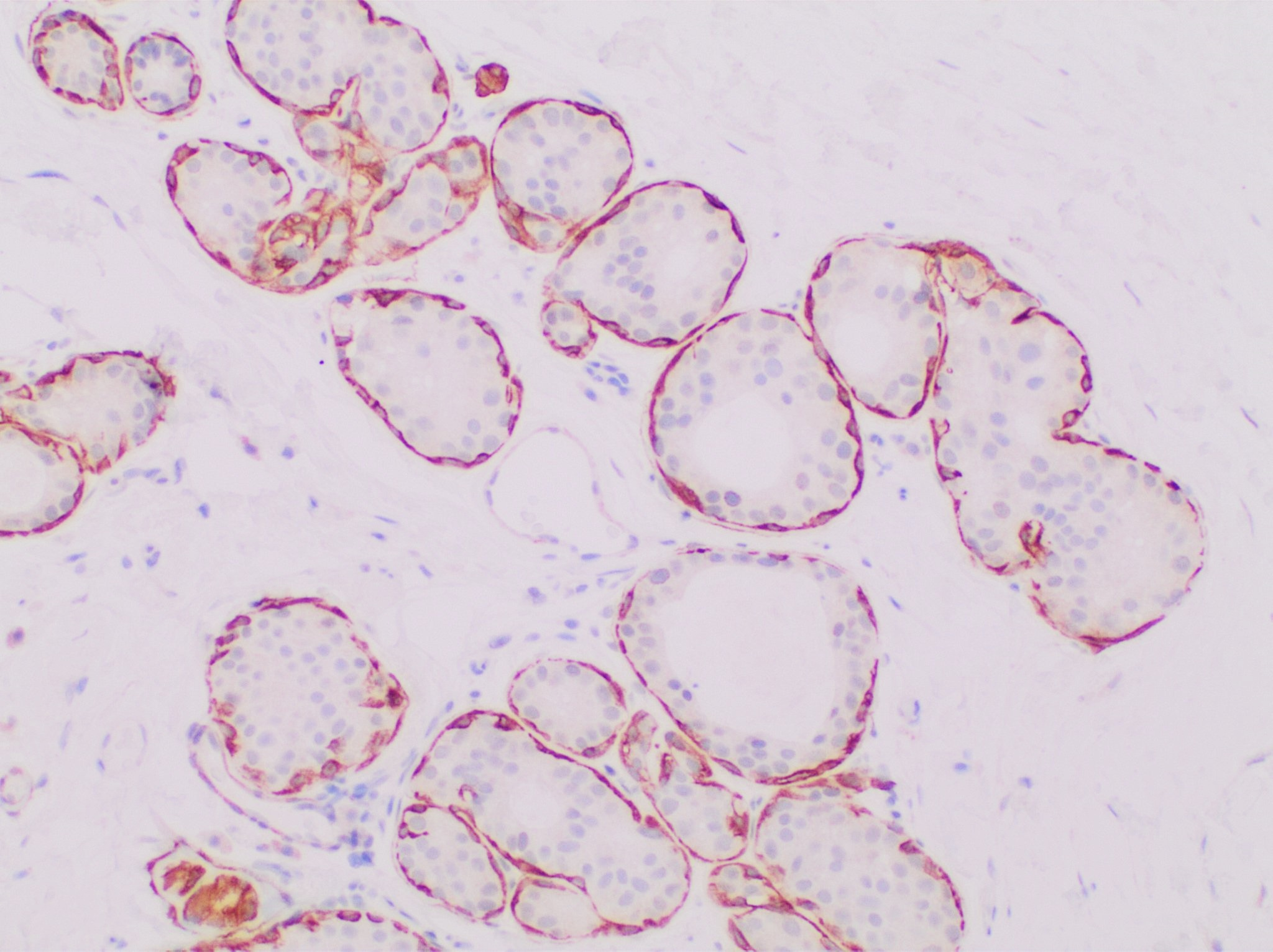
Immunohistochemistry for calponin in ductal carcinoma in situ, highlighting myoepithelial cells around all tumor cells, thereby ruling out invasive ductal carcinoma.
