= Calponin 2 =

Protein found in humans

CNN2

Identifiers
- Aliases: CNN2, calponin 2
- External IDs: OMIM: 602373; MGI: 105093; GeneCards: CNN2
Available structures
| PDB | Ortholog search: PDBe RCSB |
| PDB | List of PDB id codes 1WYN |

Gene location (Human)
| Chr. | Chromosome 19 (human) |
| Band | 19p13.3 | Start | 1,026,586 bp |
| Band | 19p13.3 | End | 1,039,068 bp |

Gene location (Mouse)
| Chr. | Chromosome 10 (mouse) |
| Band | 10|10 C1 | Start | 79,824,418 bp |
| Band | 10|10 C1 | End | 79,831,896 bp |
RNA expression pattern
| Bgee | Human / Mouse (ortholog); Top expressed in: granulocyte; stromal cell of endometrium; right ovary; right lung; left ovary; left uterine tube; blood; upper lobe of left lung; right coronary artery; thoracic aorta / Top expressed in: external carotid artery; internal carotid artery; granulocyte; mesenteric lymph nodes; left lung lobe; calvaria; blood; tibiofemoral joint; right lung; tunica media of zone of aorta; More reference expression data |
| BioGPS | n/a |
Gene ontology
| Molecular function | actin binding; calmodulin binding; cadherin binding |
| Cellular component | extracellular exosome; cytoskeleton; membrane; focal adhesion; stress fiber; cell-cell junction; extracellular region; specific granule lumen; tertiary granule lumen |
| Biological process | actomyosin structure organization; cellular response to mechanical stimulus; cytoskeleton organization; regulation of actin filament-based process; neutrophil degranulation; interleukin-12-mediated signaling pathway |
Sources:Amigo / QuickGO
Orthologs
| Databases | NCBI: entry; OMA: entry |
| Species | Human | Mouse |
| Entrez | 1265 | 12798 |
| Ensembl | ENSG00000064666 | ENSMUSG00000004665 |
| UniProt | Q99439 | Q08093 |
| RefSeq (mRNA) | NM_201277; NM_001303499; NM_001303501; NM_004368 | NM_007725 |
| RefSeq (protein) | NP_001290428; NP_001290430; NP_004359; NP_958434 | NP_031751 |
| Location (UCSC) | Chr 19: 1.03 – 1.04 Mb | Chr 10: 79.82 – 79.83 Mb |
| PubMed search |
- Wikidata
| View/Edit Human | View/Edit Mouse |

Calponin 2 is a protein that in humans is encoded by the CNN2 gene.

The CNN2 gene is located at 19p13.3 in the human chromosomal genome, encoding the protein calponin 2. Calponin 2 is one of the three isoforms of calponin and an actin filament-associated regulatory protein with wide tissue distributions. Human calponin 2 is a 33.7-kDa protein consisting of 309 amino acids with an isoelectric point (pI) of 7.23. Accordingly, it is also known as neutral calponin.

== Evolution ==
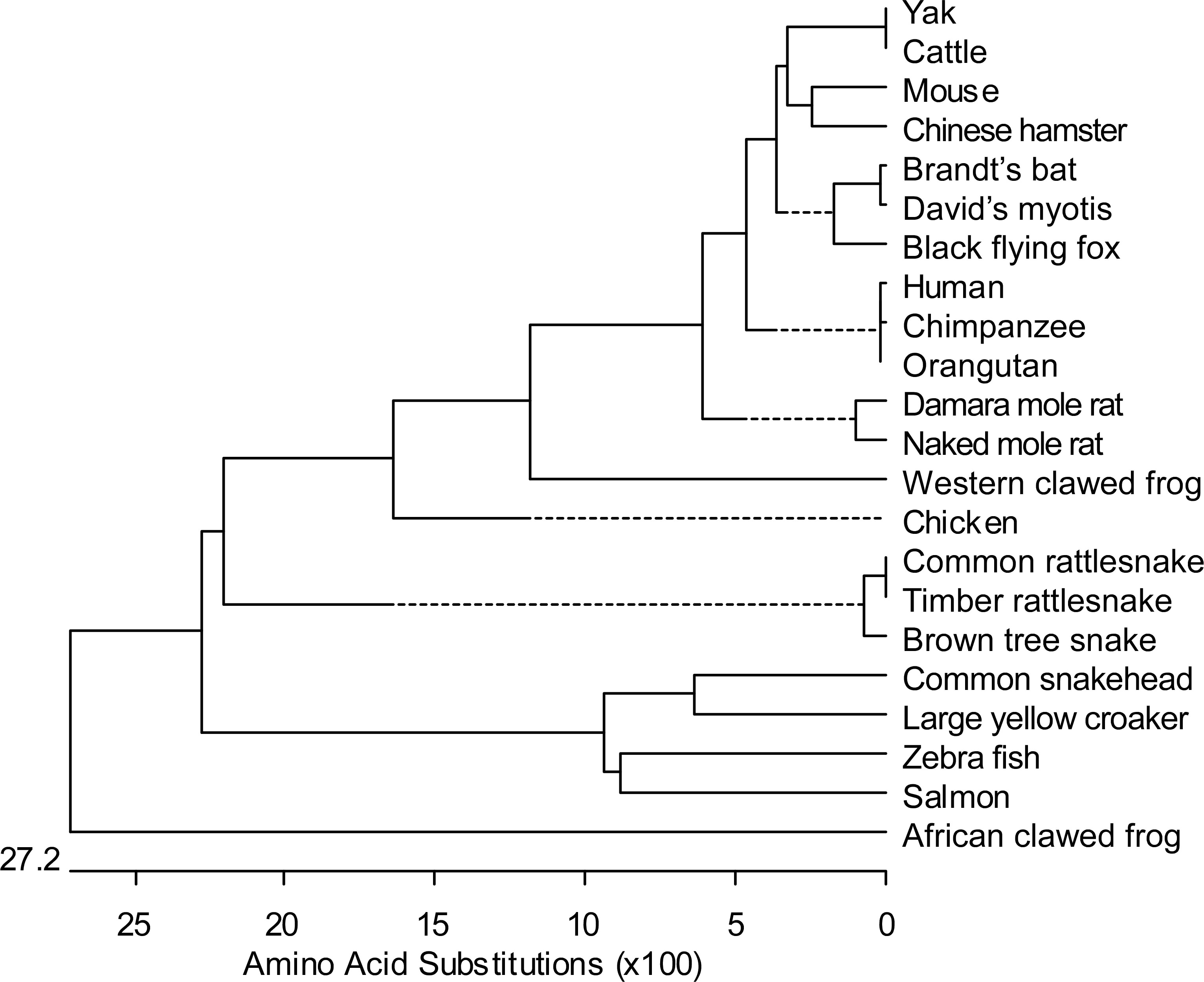
Figure 1: Evolutionary lineage of vertebrate calponin 2 deduced from alignment of amino acid sequences.

Calponin isoforms are conserved proteins whereas calponin 2 has diverged from calponin 1 and calponin 3 mainly in the C-terminal variable region. Phylogenetic lineage of calponin 2 showed that calponin 2 is conserved among mammalian species but more diverged among amphibian, reptile and fish species (Fig 1).

== Tissue distribution ==
CNN2 is expressed in a broader range of tissue and cell types, including developing and remodeling smooth muscle as well as adult mature smooth muscle, epidermal keratinocytes, fibroblasts, lung alveolar cells, endothelial cells, myeloid white blood cells, platelet, B lymphocyte, and myoblasts. These cell types can be classified as a) cells that are physiologically under high mechanical tension (e.g., smooth muscle in the wall of hollow organs, epithelial and endothelial cells), b) cells that have high rates of proliferation (e.g., myoblasts), and c) cells that are actively migrating (e.g., fibroblasts and macrophages). Therefore, the tissue distributions of calponin 2 imply its potential role in regulating cytoskeleton functions and cell motility.

== Interaction with other proteins ==
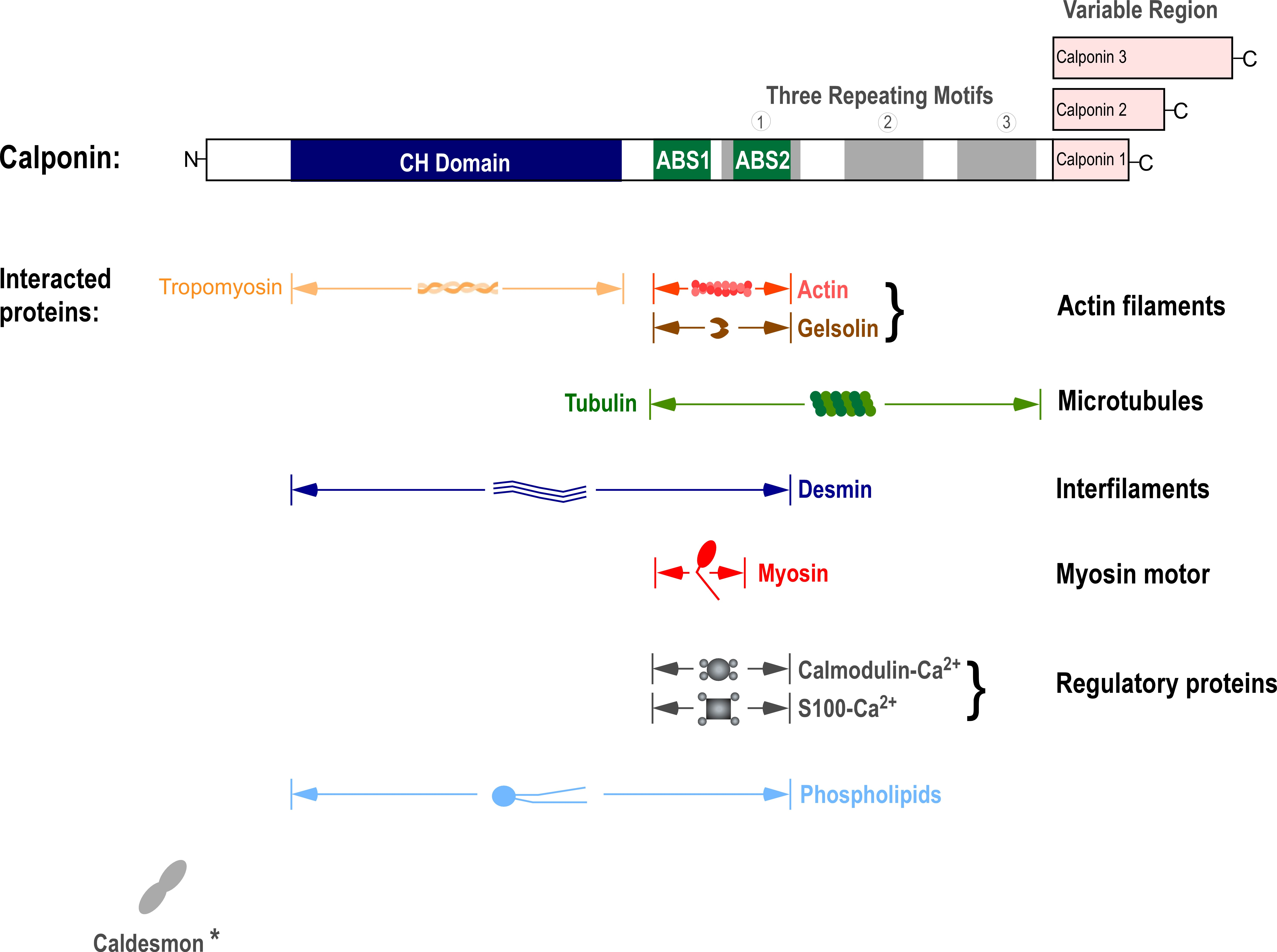
Figure 2. Proteins interacting with calponin. Calponin binds actin filaments through two actin-binding sites (ABS1 and ABS2), tropomyosin via the N-terminal CH domain, and gelsolin via the region of actin-binding sites. Calponin interacts with microtubules through the region including the actin-binding sites and the repeating motifs and with desmin through the region from N-terminal domain to the end of actin-binding sites. The segment of amino acids 144-182 in calponin interacts with myosin. In the presence of Ca^{2+}, calmodulin and S100 bind calponin at the region of actin-binding sites and reverse calponin's inhibition of myosin MgATPase. An N-terminal 22-kDa fragment of calponin interacts with phosphatidylserine and phosphatidylinositol. *The interaction between calponin and caldesmon is controversial.

In vitro protein binding studies have demonstrated that calponin binds actin and cross-links actin filaments. Calponin also binds tropomyosin, tubulin, desmin, Ca^{2+}-calmodulin, Ca^{2+}-S100, myosin, and phospholipids. Calponin also interacts with caldesmon and a-actinin, which however may only reflect their co-localization on actin filaments. The variable C-terminal segment regulates actin-binding affinity, and calponin 2 is shown to have the lowest affinity for F-actin among the three isoforms.

== Function ==
=== Cell proliferation ===
Significant amounts of calponin 2 are found in growing smooth muscle tissues such as embryonic stomach and urinary bladder as well as the uterus during early pregnancy. The expression of calponin 2 decreases to lower levels in quiescent adult smooth muscle cells while the expression of calponin 1 is up-regulated. Transfective over-expression of calponin 2 inhibited cell proliferation. A hypothesis is that higher level of calponin 2 is required in fast proliferating cells to maintain the dynamic equilibrium of the actin cytoskeleton.

=== Cell motility ===
Primary fibroblasts and peritoneal macrophages isolated from Cnn2 knockout mice migrate faster than that of wild type control cells. Calponin 2 may affect cell migration differently in different cell types and in different biological processes. A study showed that forced expression of calponin 2 in endothelial cells enhanced angiogenic cell migration in vivo and anti-sense calponin 2 RNA reduced chemotaxis of human umbilical vein endothelial cells in culture. A hypothesis is that a proper level of calponin 2 may be required to maintain the physiological motility of different cell types in different biological processes. Calponin 2's regulation of cell motility is based on inhibition of actin activated myosin motor function, as fibroblasts isolated from Cnn2 knockout mice showed increased cell traction force generated by myosin II motors.

=== Cell adhesion ===
A significant level of calponin 2 is found in human and mouse platelets. Platelet adhesion is a critical step in blood coagulation and thrombosis. In a microfluidic flow-based thrombosis assay, the time to initiation of rapid platelet/thrombus accumulation was significantly longer in blood samples from Cnn2 knockout versus wild type mice. The effect of calponin 2 on facilitating the velocity of cell adhesion was also shown with prostate cancer cells expression high or low levels of calponin 2.

=== Immune cells ===
Significant amounts of calponin 2 are found in blood cells of myeloid lineage. Monocytes derived from Cnn2 gene knockout mice proliferated faster than wild type control cells. Calponin 2-null macrophages migrated faster and exhibit enhanced phagocytosis. In global as well as myeloid cell-specific Cnn2 knockout mice, the development of inflammatory arthritis induced by anti-glucose-6-phosphate isomerase serum was significantly attenuated as compared with that in wild type mice . Deletion of calponin 2 in macrophages also significantly attenuated the development of atherosclerosis lesions in apolipoprotein E knockout (ApoE-/-) mice

== Regulation by mechanical tension ==
=== Gene expression ===
The expression of calponin 2 is significantly increased in cells cultured on hard versus soft gel substrates that produce high or low traction force and cytoskeleton tension. The expression of calponin 2 in NIH/3T3 cells was decreased when cytoskeleton tension was reduced after blebbistatin inhibition of myosin II motors. To demonstrate the Cnn2 promoter-specific regulation, transfective expression of calponin 2 using a cytomegalovirus promoter was independent of the stiffness of culture substrate.

A binding site for transcriptional factor HES-1 (hairy and enhancer of split 1) has been identified in the 5'-upstream region of mouse Cnn2 promoter, responsible for the mechanical regulation. HES-1 is known to function downstream of the Notch-RBP J signaling pathway, which has been suggested to mediate cellular mechanoregulation. Deletion or mutation of the HES-1 site abolished the mechanical regulation and resulted in a substrate stiffness independent high level of transcription. Therefore, the regulatory mechanism is a low tension-induced repression. Corresponding to the down-regulation of Cnn2 gene expression, the level of HES-1 increased in cells cultured on soft gel substrate in comparison with that in cells cultured on hard substrates.

=== Degradation ===
Calponin 2 is also regulated by mechanical tension at the protein level. A rapid and selective degradation of calponin 2 occurs in lung tissues after a short period of deflation. This low cytoskeleton tension-induced degradation of calponin 2 in collapsed lung was completely prevented in post mortem mouse lung simply by air inflation to maintain tension applied to the alveoli. The cytoskeleton tension-dependent stability of calponin 2 was further confirmed in monolayer cells cultured on expanded elastic membrane by its rapid degradation after a reduction of the dimension of the cultural substrate to acutely reduce cytoskeleton tension.
