= Calponin family repeat =

Protein domain

Calponin

Identifiers
- Symbol: Calponin
- Pfam: PF00402
- InterPro: IPR000557
- PROSITE: PDOC00808
Available protein structures:
- Pfam: structures / ECOD
- PDB: RCSB PDB; PDBe; PDBj
- PDBsum: structure summary

In molecular biology, the calponin family repeat is a 26 amino acid protein domain. Calponin 1 (CNN1) contains three copies of this domain. This domain is also found in vertebrate smooth muscle protein (SM22 or transgelin), and a number of other proteins whose physiological role is not yet established, including Drosophila synchronous flight muscle protein SM20, Caenorhabditis elegans unc-87 protein, rat neuronal protein NP25, and an Onchocerca volvulus antigen.
