= Caldesmon =

Mammalian protein found in Homo sapiens

CALD1

Identifiers
- Aliases: CALD1, CDM, H-CAD, HCAD, L-CAD, LCAD, NAG22, caldesmon 1, h-CD
- External IDs: OMIM: 114213; GeneCards: CALD1

Gene location (Human)
Chr.	Chromosome 7 (human)
Band	7q33	Start	134,744,252 bp
Band	7q33	End	134,970,729 bp
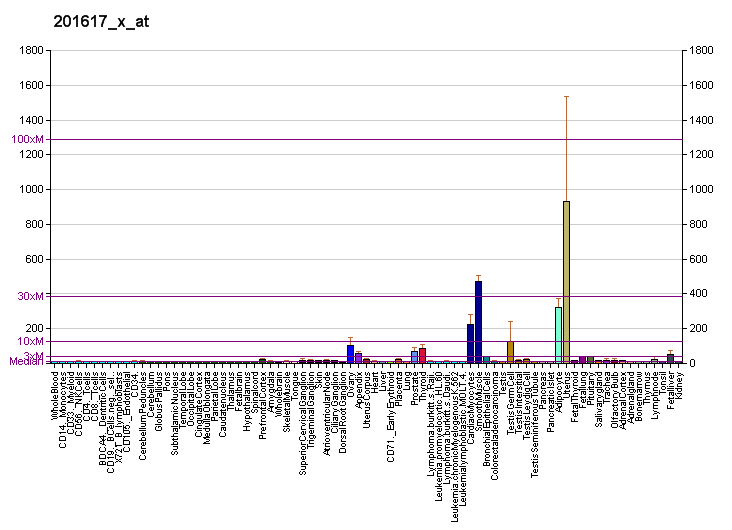

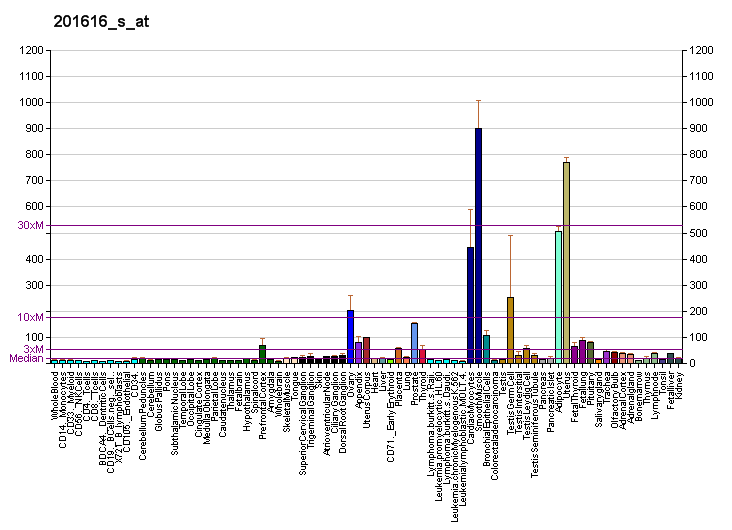

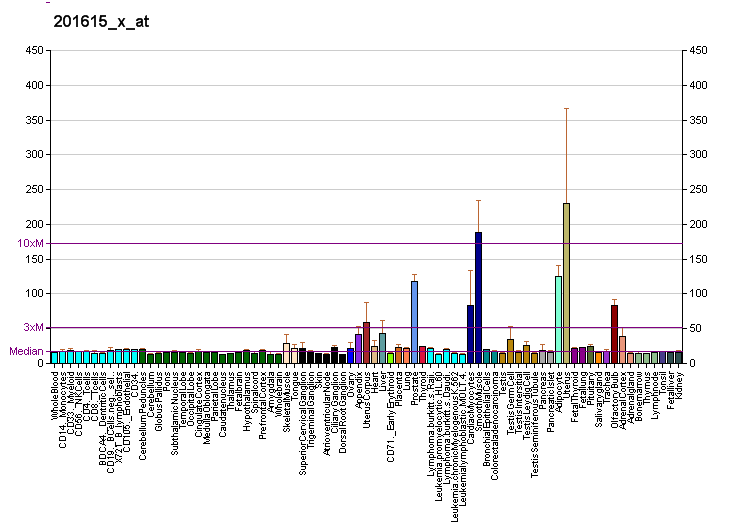
RNA expression pattern
Bgee	Human / Mouse (ortholog); Top expressed in: saphenous vein; tail of epididymis; seminal vesicula; tendon of biceps brachii; urethra; superficial temporal artery; visceral pleura; parietal pleura; stromal cell of endometrium; right coronary artery / n/a; More reference expression data
BioGPS	More reference expression data
Gene ontology
Molecular function	myosin binding; actin binding; tropomyosin binding; protein binding; calmodulin binding; cadherin binding
Cellular component	cytoplasm; cytosol; plasma membrane; myofibril; cytoskeleton; actin cytoskeleton; intracellular membrane-bounded organelle; membrane; actin cap
Biological process	muscle contraction
Sources:Amigo / QuickGO
Orthologs
Databases	NCBI: entry; OMA: entry
Species	Human	Mouse
Entrez	800	n/a
Ensembl	ENSG00000122786	n/a
UniProt	Q05682	n/a
RefSeq (mRNA)	NM_004342; NM_033138; NM_033139; NM_033140; NM_033157	n/a
RefSeq (protein)	NP_004333; NP_149129; NP_149130; NP_149131; NP_149347	n/a
Location (UCSC)	Chr 7: 134.74 – 134.97 Mb	n/a
PubMed search		n/a
- Wikidata
View/Edit Human

Caldesmon is a protein that in humans is encoded by the CALD1 gene.

Caldesmon is a calmodulin binding protein. Like calponin, caldesmon tonically inhibits the ATPase activity of myosin in smooth muscle.

This gene encodes a calmodulin- and actin-binding protein that plays an essential role in the regulation of smooth muscle and nonmuscle contraction. The conserved domain of this protein possesses the binding activities to $\text{Ca}^{2+}$-calmodulin, actin, tropomyosin, myosin, and phospholipids. This protein is a potent inhibitor of the actin-tropomyosin activated myosin MgATPase, and serves as a mediating factor for $\text{Ca}^{2+}$-dependent inhibition of smooth muscle contraction. Alternative splicing of this gene results in multiple transcript variants encoding distinct isoforms.

== Immunochemistry ==
In diagnostic immunochemistry, caldesmon is a marker for smooth muscle differentiation.
