= Resistance artery =

Blood vessel in the microcirculation

A resistance artery is small diameter blood vessel in the microcirculation that contributes significantly to the creation of the resistance to flow and regulation of blood flow. Resistance arteries are usually small arteries or arterioles and include precapillary sphincters. Having thick muscular walls and narrow lumen they contribute the most to the resistance to blood flow. Degree of the contraction of vascular smooth muscle in the wall of a resistance artery is directly connected to the size of the lumen.

== Definition ==
Functionally from physiological point of view blood vessels can be divided in several categories

- Buffer vessels – aorta, middle-sized arteries
- Resistance vessels – arterioles, pre- and postcapillaries.
- Metabolic vessels – capillaries
- Capacitance vessels – veins

Particular feature of resistance vessels is ability to change lumen crossectional area and influence blood pressure. Human arteries or arterioles that are around 0.2 mm or smaller contribute to creation of the blood flow resistance and are called resistance arteries.

== Physiology ==
The small arteries have a task of regulating local blood flow in every part of a body. They do so by adjustments of their diameter. Quick functional changes are accomplished by contraction and relaxation of smooth muscle cells in the wall of the small arteries.

== Pathophysiology ==
Resistance arteries are the target of a disease in case of stenosis (narrowing of the lumen) or arteriosclerosis. In both cases, normal functionality of resistance arteries is lost. Chronic changes in diameter result from vascular remodeling - reshaping of the vascular wall, where existing elements are reorganized, new elements are added or elements are broken down. The regulation of arterial diameter and wall structure is a continuous process of adaptation to changing needs, ranging from exercise to development of the body. This adaptation may malfunction: too small a diameter of the resistance vessels relates to insufficient tissue perfusion as well as hypertension.

The vascular wall consists of amongst others the vascular smooth muscle cells, endothelial cells that line the lumen, and elastic fibers and other extracellular matrix elements. Physical forces form an important part of the adaptation mechanisms of small arteries: Blood pressure causes distension of the matrix elements, but also induces contraction of the smooth muscle cells and production of more cells and more matrix. Blood flow is sensed by the endothelial cells, which release factors such as nitric oxide that cause relaxation and remodeling towards larger diameters. Forces, cells, and matrix, therefore, form a triangle of mutual effects that underlie vascular adaptation.
