= Calponin 1 =

Protein found in humans

CNN1

Identifiers
- Aliases: CNN1, HEL-S-14, SMCC, Sm-Calp, calponin 1
- External IDs: OMIM: 600806; MGI: 104979; GeneCards: CNN1
Available structures
PDB	Ortholog search: PDBe RCSB
PDB	List of PDB id codes 1WYP

Gene location (Human)
Chr.	Chromosome 19 (human)
Band	19p13.2	Start	11,538,767 bp
Band	19p13.2	End	11,550,323 bp

Gene location (Mouse)
Chr.	Chromosome 9 (mouse)
Band	9|9 A3	Start	22,010,512 bp
Band	9|9 A3	End	22,020,926 bp
RNA expression pattern
Bgee	Human / Mouse (ortholog); Top expressed in: saphenous vein; popliteal artery; tibial arteries; body of uterus; tail of epididymis; right coronary artery; seminal vesicula; gastric mucosa; myometrium; urethra / Top expressed in: ascending aorta; tunica media of zone of aorta; cervix; aortic valve; umbilical cord; left colon; seminal vesicula; pyloric antrum; atrium; migratory enteric neural crest cell; More reference expression data
BioGPS	n/a
Gene ontology
Molecular function	actin binding; calmodulin binding; protein binding
Cellular component	cytoskeleton; focal adhesion
Biological process	actomyosin structure organization; regulation of smooth muscle contraction; negative regulation of vascular associated smooth muscle cell proliferation
Sources:Amigo / QuickGO
Orthologs
Databases	NCBI: entry; OMA: entry
Species	Human	Mouse
Entrez	1264	12797
Ensembl	ENSG00000130176	ENSMUSG00000001349
UniProt	P51911	Q08091
RefSeq (mRNA)	NM_001299; NM_001308341; NM_001308342	NM_009922
RefSeq (protein)	NP_001290; NP_001295270; NP_001295271	NP_034052
Location (UCSC)	Chr 19: 11.54 – 11.55 Mb	Chr 9: 22.01 – 22.02 Mb
PubMed search
- Wikidata
View/Edit Human	View/Edit Mouse

Calponin 1 is a basic smooth muscle protein that in humans is encoded by the CNN1 gene.

The CNN1 gene is located at 19p13.2-p13.1 in the human chromosomal genome and contains 7 exons, encoding the protein calponin 1, an actin filament-associated regulatory protein. Human calponin 1 is a 33.2-KDa protein consists of 297 amino acids with an isoelectric point of 9.1, thus calponin 1 is also known as basic calponin.

== Evolution ==
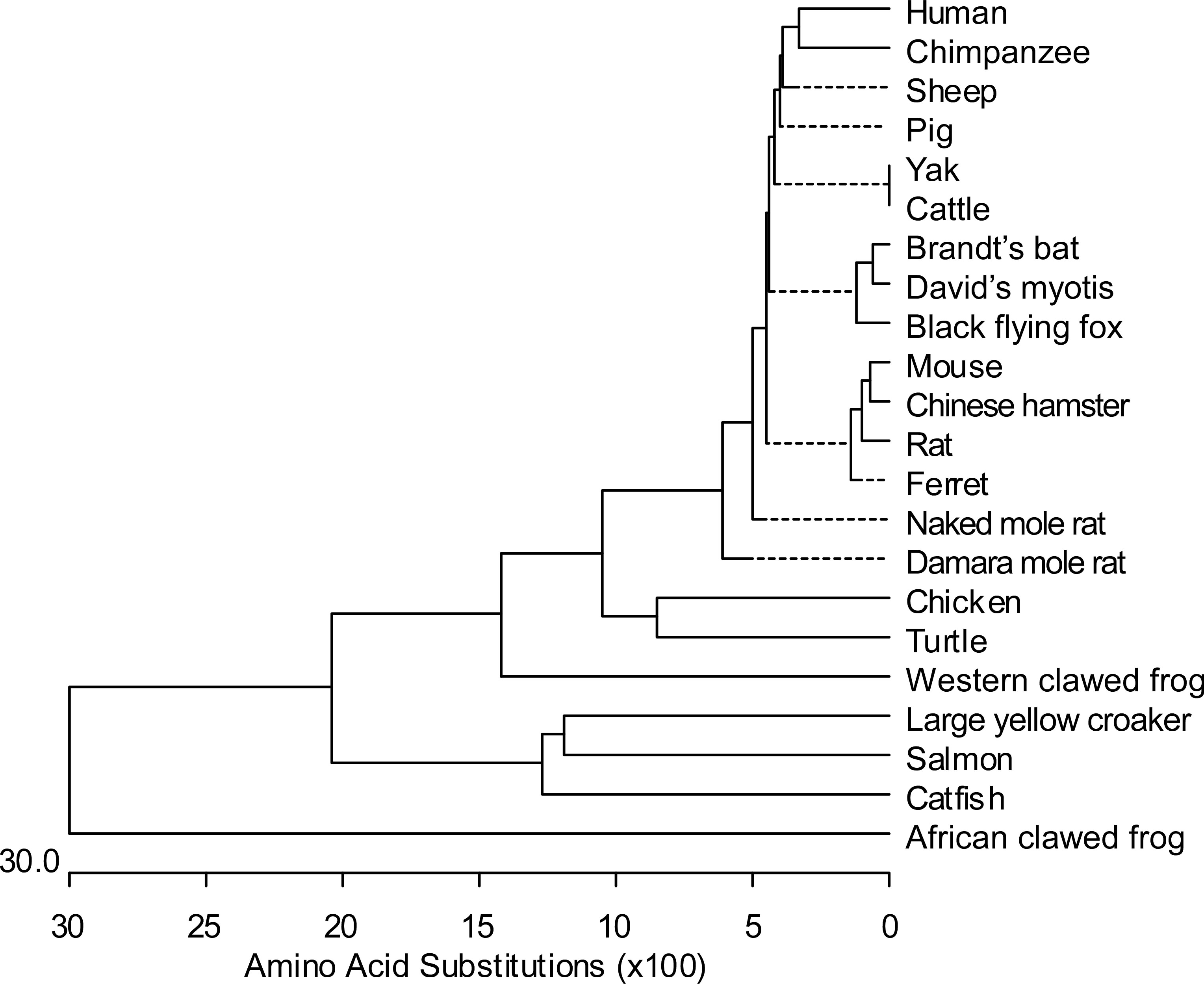
Figure 1: Evolutionary lineage of vertebrate CNN1.

Three homologous genes, Cnn1, Cnn2 and Cnn3, have evolved in vertebrates, encoding three isoforms of calponin: calponin 1, calponin 2, calponin 3, respectively. Protein sequence alignment shows that calponin 1 is highly conserved in mammals but more diverged among lower vertebrates.

== Smooth muscle-specific expression ==
The expression of CNN1 is specific to differentiated mature smooth muscle cells, suggesting a role in contractile functions. Calponin 1 is up-regulated in smooth muscle tissues during postnatal development with a higher content in phasic smooth muscle of the digestive tract.

== Structure-function relationship ==
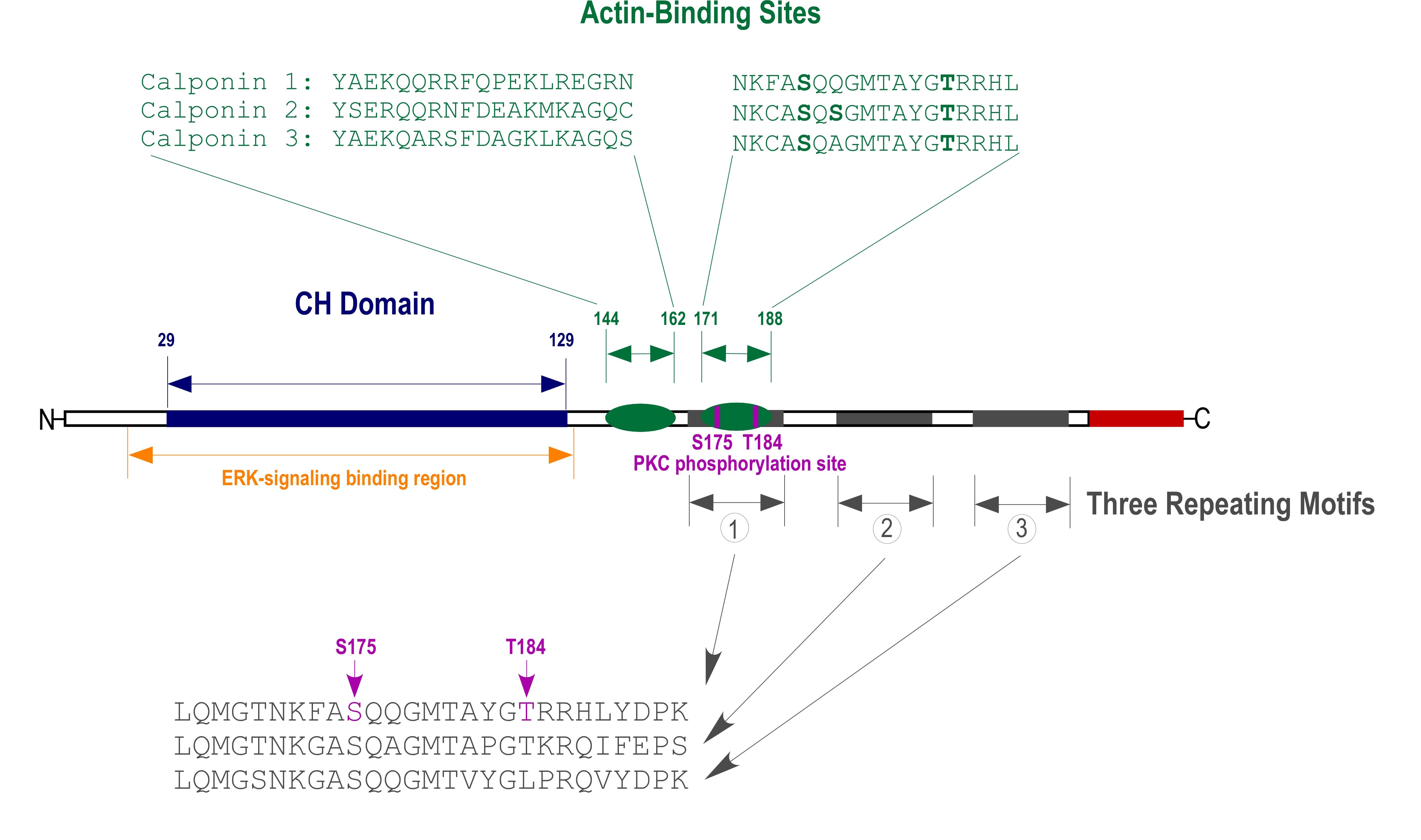
Figure 2. Structural and functional domains of calponin. The linear structural map summarized primarily from studies of chicken calponin 1 illustrates the structural and functional domains of calponin. The CH domain, two actin-binding sites, three repeating sequence motifs, and the C-terminal variable region are outlined. The CH domain overlaps with the ERK signaling binding region. Amino acid sequences of the two actin-binding sites in the three isoforms and the three repeating motifs of calponin 1 are shown in the insets. The regulatory phosphorylation sites Ser_{175} and Thr_{184} are located in the second actin-binding site that overlaps with the first repeating motif. Potentially phosphorylatable serine residues corresponding to Ser_{175} are conserved in repeats 2 and 3, while a Thr_{184} equivalent is conserved in repeat 2. Different from calponin 1 and calponin 3, calponin 2 has a potentially phosphorylatable additional serine at position 177.

The majority of structure-function relationship studies of calponin were with experiments using chicken calponin 1. Primary structure of calponin consists of a conserved N-terminal calponin homology (CH) domain, a conserved middle region containing two actin-binding sites, and a C-terminal variable region that contributes to the differences among there isoforms.

=== The CH domain ===
The CH domain was found in a number of actin-binding proteins (such as α-actinin, spectrin, and filamin) to form the actin-binding region or serve as a regulatory structure. However, the CH domain in calponin is not the binding site for actin nor does it regulate the modes of calponin-F-actin binding. Nonetheless, CH domain in calponin was found to bind to extra-cellular regulated kinase (ERK) for calponin to play a possible role as an adaptor protein in the ERK signaling cascades.

=== Actin-binding sites ===
Calponin binds actin to promote and sustain polymerization. The binding of calponin to F-actin inhibits the MgATPase activity of smooth muscle myosin. Calponin binds F-actin through two sites at residues 144-162 and 171–188 in chicken calponin 1. The two actin-binding sites are conserved in the three calponin isoforms.

There are three repeating sequence motifs in calponin next to the C-terminal region. This repeating structure is conserved in all three isoforms and across species. Outlined in Fig. 2, the first repeating motif overlaps with the second actin-binding site and contains protein kinase C (PKC) phosphorylation sites Ser175 and Thr184 that are not present in the first actin-binding site. This feature is consistent with the hypothesis that the second actin-binding site plays a regulatory role in the binding of calponin to the actin filament. Similar sequences as well as potential phosphorylation sites are present in repeats 2 and 3 whereas their function is unknown.

=== C-terminal variable region ===
The C-terminal segment of calponin has diverged significantly among the three isoforms. The variable lengths and amino acid sequences of the C-terminal segment produce the size and charge differences among the calponin isoforms. The corresponding charge features rendered calponin 1, 2 and 3 the names of basic, neutral and acidic calponins.

The C-terminal segment of calponin has an effect on weakening the binding of calponin to F-actin. Deletion of the C-terminal tail strongly enhanced the actin-binding and bundling activities of all three isoforms of calponin. The C-terminal tail regulates the interaction with F-actin by altering the function of the second actin-bing site of calponin.

== Regulation of smooth muscle contractility ==
Numerous in vitro experimental data indicate that calponin 1 functions as an inhibitory regulator of smooth muscle contractility through inhibiting actomyosin interactions. In this regulation, binding of Ca^{2+}-calmodulin and PKC phosphorylation dissociate calponin 1 from the actin filament and facilitate smooth muscle contraction.

In vivo data also support the role of calponin 1 as regulator of smooth muscle contractility. While aortic smooth muscle of adult Wistar Kyoto rats, which naturally lacks calponin 1, is fully contractile, it has a decreased sensitivity to norepinephrine activation. Matrix metalloproteinase-2 proteolysis of calponin 1 resulted in vascular hypocontractility to phenylephrine. Vas deferens smooth muscle from calponin 1 knockout mice showed faster maximum shortening velocity. Calponin 1 knockout mice exhibited blunted MAP response to phenylephrine administration.

== Phosphorylation regulation ==
There is a large collection of in vitro evidences demonstrating the phosphorylation regulation of calponin. The primary phosphorylation sites are Ser175 and Thr184 in the second actin-binding site (Fig. 2). Experimental data showed that Ser175 and Thr184 in calponin 1 are phosphorylated by PKC in vitro. Direct association was found between calponin 1 and PKCα and PKCε. Calmodulin-dependent kinase II and Rho-kinase are also found to phosphorylate calponin at Ser175 and Thr184 in vitro. Of these two residues, the main site of regulatory phosphorylation by calmodulin-dependent kinase II and Rho-kinase is Ser175. Dephosphorylation of calponin is catalyzed by type 2B protein phosphatase

Unphosphorylated calponin binds to actin and inhibits actomyosin MgATPase. Ser175 phosphorylation alters the molecular conformation of calponin and dissociates calponin from F-actin. The consequence is to release the inhibition of actomyosin MgATPase and increase the production of force.

Despite the overwhelming evidence for the phosphorylation regulation of calponin obtained from in vitro studies, phosphorylated calponin is not readily detectable in vivo or in living cells under physiological conditions. Based on the observation that PKC phosphorylation of calponin 1 weakens the binding affinity for the actin filaments, the phosphorylated calponin may not be stable in the actin cytoskeleton thus be degraded in the cell.
