= CFAP47 =

Protein-coding gene in humans

Identifiers
- Aliases: CFAP47, CXorf59, CHDC2, CXorf22, CXorf30, cilia and flagella associated protein 47, SPGF52, SPGFX3
- External IDs: GeneCards: CFAP47

Gene location (Human)
Chr.	X chromosome (human)
Band	Xp21.1	Start	35,919,734 bp
Band	Xp21.1	End	36,385,317 bp
RNA expression pattern
Bgee	Human / Mouse (ortholog); Top expressed in: bronchial epithelial cell; right uterine tube; buccal mucosa cell; mucosa of paranasal sinus; testicle; olfactory zone of nasal mucosa; epithelium of nasopharynx; gonad; secondary oocyte; ventricular zone / n/a; More reference expression data
BioGPS	n/a
Orthologs
Databases	NCBI: entry; OMA: entry
Species	Human	Mouse
Entrez	286464	n/a
Ensembl	ENSG00000165164	n/a
UniProt	Q6ZTR5	n/a
RefSeq (mRNA)	NM_173695; NM_001304548; NM_152632	n/a
RefSeq (protein)	NP_001291477; NP_689845	n/a
Location (UCSC)	Chr X: 35.92 – 36.39 Mb	n/a
PubMed search		n/a
- Wikidata
View/Edit Human

CFAP47, or cilia and flagella associated protein 47, is a human gene encoded on the X chromosome. in humans. CXorf59 is located on chromosome X at locus Xp21.1 of the human genome.

== Protein ==
CXorf59 is most commonly known as Cilia- and flagella- associated protein 47 (CFAP47) in other species.

== Gene ==
CFAP47 is a 3187 amino acid protein that has seven splice variants and contains 64 exons. Genecard listed aliases for CXorf59 as Cilia and Flagella Associated Protein 47 (CFAP47), Calponin Homology Domain-Containing Protein 2 (CHDC2), FLJ3660, CXorf22, and CXorf30

== Orthologs and paralogs ==
Orthologs have been found in mammalia, aves, reptilia, amphibia, osteichthyes; sarcopterygii and actinopterygii, ascidiacea, gastropoda, cephalopoda, insecta, and demospongiae. There are no paralogs within the human genome.

== Expression ==
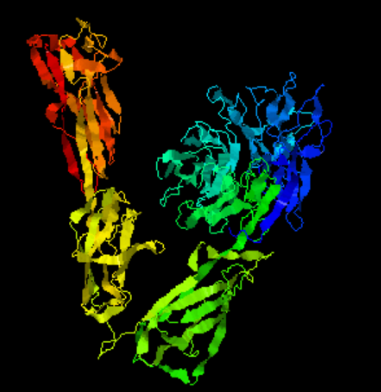
Hypothetical protein structure of CFAP47 produced by I-Tasser.

CXorf59 is a protein coding gene that is confirmed to be expressed in 27 different tissues. The liver, testis, thyroid, brain, and endometrium were higher in reads per kilobase of transcript (RPKM). While this gene is associated with cilia and flagella, there is no current functional information available on this protein. CXorf59 is also related to Calponin, a calcium binding protein. In the 324 to 403 base pair region, there is a Calponin homology domain. Calponin homology domains are found in cytoskeletal and signal transduction proteins. They are composed of four alpha helices and are actin-binding.
