= Calponin 3, acidic =

Protein found in humans

CNN3

Identifiers
- Aliases: CNN3, calponin 3
- External IDs: OMIM: 602374; MGI: 1919244; GeneCards: CNN3

Gene location (Human)
| Chr. | Chromosome 1 (human) |
| Band | 1p21.3 | Start | 94,896,949 bp |
| Band | 1p21.3 | End | 94,927,223 bp |

Gene location (Mouse)
| Chr. | Chromosome 3 (mouse) |
| Band | 3|3 G1 | Start | 121,220,146 bp |
| Band | 3|3 G1 | End | 121,251,856 bp |
RNA expression pattern
| Bgee | Human / Mouse (ortholog); Top expressed in: ventricular zone; Achilles tendon; ganglionic eminence; left adrenal gland; right adrenal gland; tibial nerve; body of uterus; left adrenal cortex; right adrenal cortex; left uterine tube / Top expressed in: endocardial cushion; dermis; ciliary body; iris; external carotid artery; human fetus; atrioventricular valve; vestibular sensory epithelium; ureter; umbilical cord; More reference expression data |
| BioGPS | n/a |
Gene ontology
| Molecular function | microtubule binding; actin binding; calmodulin binding; cadherin binding involved in cell-cell adhesion |
| Cellular component | soma; dendritic spine; dendrite; postsynaptic density; focal adhesion; actin cytoskeleton; cytosol |
| Biological process | negative regulation of ATP-dependent activity; actomyosin structure organization; epithelial cell differentiation; cell-cell adhesion |
Sources:Amigo / QuickGO
Orthologs
| Databases | NCBI: entry; OMA: entry |
| Species | Human | Mouse |
| Entrez | 1266 | 71994 |
| Ensembl | ENSG00000117519 | ENSMUSG00000053931 |
| UniProt | Q15417 | Q9DAW9 |
| RefSeq (mRNA) | NM_001839; NM_001286055; NM_001286056 | NM_028044 |
| RefSeq (protein) | NP_001272984; NP_001272985; NP_001830 | NP_082320 |
| Location (UCSC) | Chr 1: 94.9 – 94.93 Mb | Chr 3: 121.22 – 121.25 Mb |
| PubMed search |
- Wikidata
| View/Edit Human | View/Edit Mouse |

Calponin 3, acidic is a protein that in humans is encoded by the CNN3 gene.

The CNN3 gene is located at 1p22-p21 in the human chromosomal genome. CNN3 gene contains 7 exons and encodes calponin 3, a 36.4-kDa protein consisting of 329 amino acids with isoelectric point (pI) of 5.84. Calponin 3 is known as acidic calponin. Among three isoforms of calponin, less is known for the gene regulation and function of calponin 3. Nonetheless, much has been learned from extensive studies on the homologous genes CNN1 and CNN2 that encode calponin 1 and calponin 2.

== Evolution ==
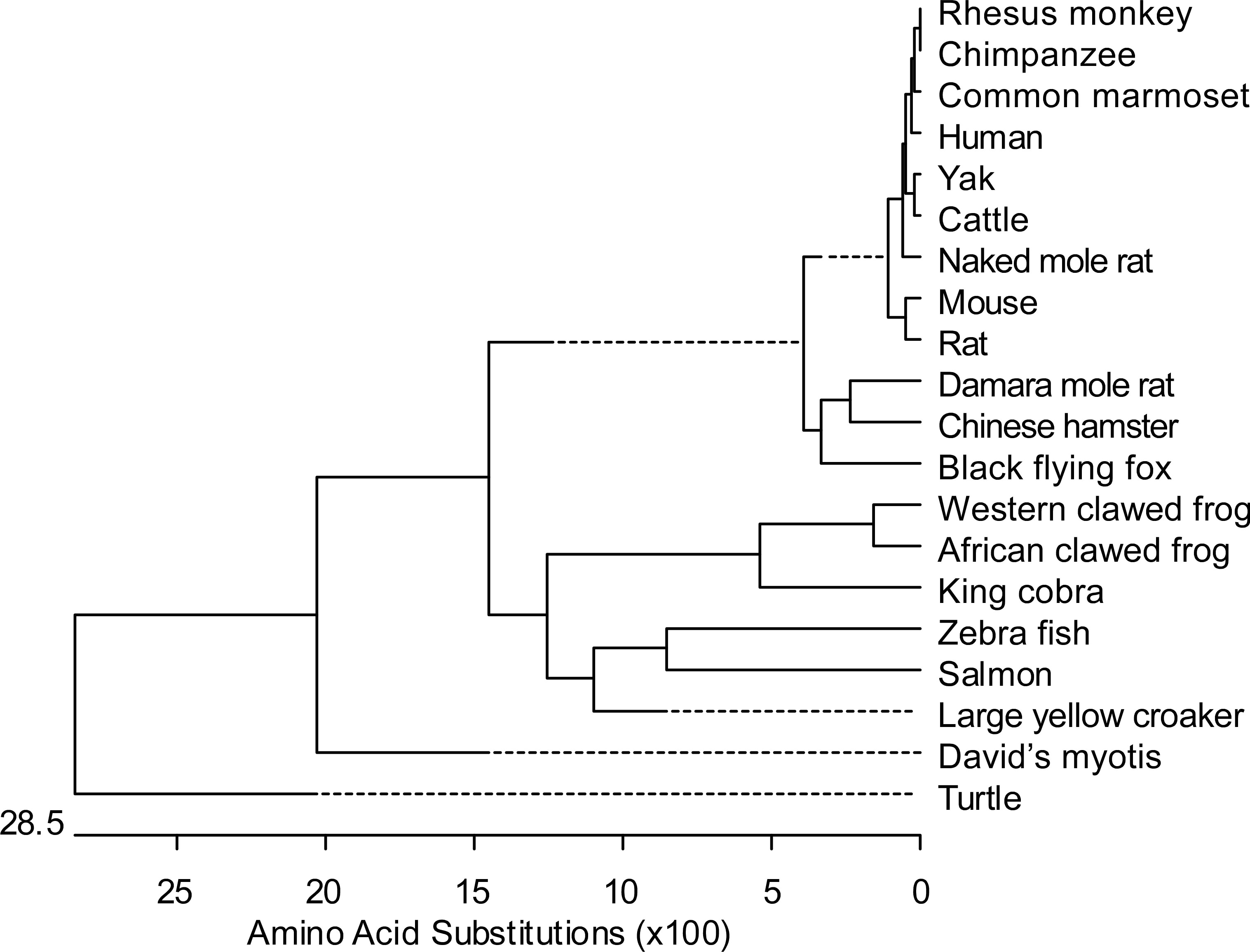
Figure 1. Evolutionary lineage of vertebrate calponin 3 isoforms deduced from alignment of amino acid sequences.

CNN3 is one of the three homologous calponin isoform genes. Calponin 3 is significantly diverged from calponin 1 and calponin 2 in the C terminal variable region. The higher degree of divergence among vertebrate CNN3 genes than that in the CNN1 and CNN2 gene families suggests possibly earlier emergence of CNN3, indicating that calponin 3 may represent a prototype of calponin ancestral of the three present-day isoforms (Fig. 1).

== Structure-function relationships ==
The primary structure of calponin 3 is similar as that of calponin 1 and calponin 2, consisting of a conserved N-terminal calponin homology (CH) domain, a conserved middle region containing two actin-binding sites, and a C-terminal variable region. The unique length amino acid sequence of the C-terminal segment of the three calponin isoforms are responsible for their size and overall charge differences.

Calponin 3 has been shown to participate in actin cytoskeleton-based activities such as that in embryonic development and myogenesis. Unlike calponin 1, calponin 3 has little effect on actomyosin Mg^{2+}-ATPase activity and does not cause actin filaments bundling at the same condition as calponin 1 does.

== Tissue distribution ==
Calponin 3 is found in the brain with expression in neurons, astrocytes, and glial cells, where it may function in regulating the actin cytoskeleton with a proposed role in the plasticity of neural tissues. Calponin 3 is also present in embryonic trophoblasts and myoblasts with functions in cell fusion during embryonic development and myogenesis Calponin 3 is also expressed in B lymphocytes.

== Function ==
Calponin 3 was found in stress fibers of skin fibroblasts and myofibroblasts during wound healing. Cnn3 knockdown in primary fibroblasts impaired stress fiber formation, resulting in decreased cell motility and contractile ability. Calponin 3 in the brain has a potential function in regulating actin filaments during neuronal remodeling. Calponin 3 was also found in dendritic spines of adult hippocampal neurons to regulate dendritic spine plasticity. While mice with systemic knockout of Cnn1 or Cnn2, or both Cnn1 and Cnn2 survive to adulthood and fertile, systemic knockout of calponin 3 in mice results in embryonic and neonatal lethality due to defect in the development of central nervous system. CNN3 was found in the trophoblasts of human placenta and plays a role of negative regulator of trophoblast fusion. Knockdown or dissociation of calponin 3 from cytoskeleton in response to PKC phosphorylation promoted fusion of trophoblasts.

Consistently, calponin 3 was also present in myoblasts as an inhibitory regulator of cell fusion. Overexpression of calponin 3 in mouse C_{2}C_{12} myoblasts inhibited cell fusion during in vitro differentiation, whereas Cnn3 gene knockdown promoted cell fusion and the expression of skeletal muscle myosin. The inhibitory effect of calponin 3 was reversed upon phosphorylation by Rho-associated kinase 1/2 (ROCK1/2).
