= Multisystemic smooth muscle dysfunction syndrome =

- Other names: Congenital mydriasis

Multisystemic smooth muscle dysfunction syndrome (MSMDS) is a genetic disorder caused by R179 missense mutations in the ACTA2 gene. Initially described as a case report in 1999, it was characterized in 2010 as a syndrome of congenital mydriasis, patent ductus arteriosus, and aneurysmal arterial disease—in particular aortic and thoracic aneurysms. The disorder has variable penetrance, ranging from severely symptomatic and fatal in early neonatal period to a more benign and manageable course with surgical intervention.

== Signs and symptoms ==
Signs and symptoms are usually detectable prenatally or shortly after birth. In its severe manifestations, MSMDS has been associated with prune belly sequence. In less severe forms, the earliest signs of MSMDS are congenital fixed mydriasis (can be misdiagnosed as partial aniridia), and a PDA requiring surgical intervention. Most carriers of the mutation will eventually develop thoracic arterial disease between the ages of 10–25.

== Pathogenesis ==
The most commonly associated mutation with MSMDS is R179H.

== Management ==
Management of MSMDS requires lifelong surveillance and surgical intervention when required. The first comprehensive guidelines were published in 2018 by the same group that first categorized the syndrome in 2010.
