= Smooth muscle =

Involuntary non-striated muscle

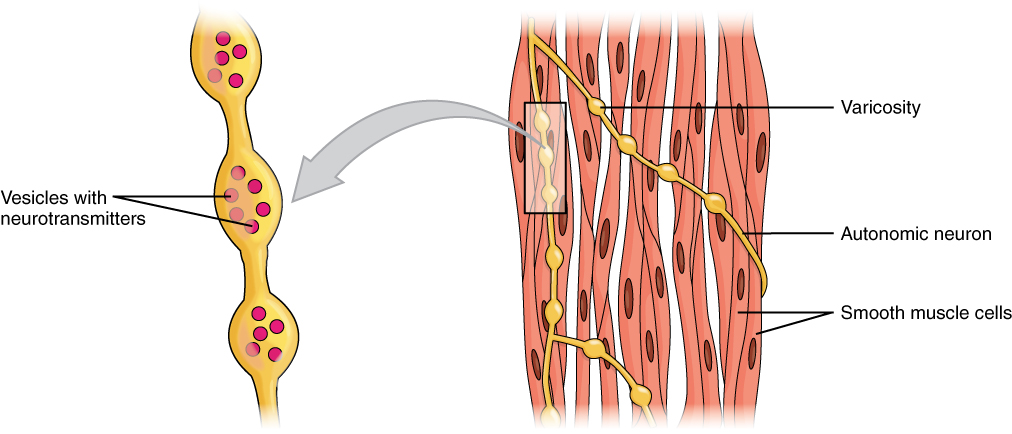
- Depiction of smooth muscle

Details

Identifiers
- Latin: muscularis levis; muscularis nonstriatus
- MeSH: D009130
- TH: H2.00.05.1.00001
- FMA: 14070

Smooth muscle is one of the three major types of vertebrate muscle tissue, the others being skeletal and cardiac muscle. It can also be found in invertebrates and is controlled by the autonomic nervous system. It is non-striated, so-called because it has no sarcomeres and therefore no striations (bands or stripes). It can be divided into two subgroups, single-unit and multi-unit smooth muscle. Within single-unit muscle, the whole bundle or sheet of smooth muscle cells contracts as a syncytium.

Smooth muscle is found in the walls of hollow organs, including the stomach, intestines, bladder and uterus. In the walls of blood vessels, and lymph vessels, (excluding blood and lymph capillaries) it is known as vascular smooth muscle. There is smooth muscle in the tracts of the respiratory, urinary, and reproductive systems. In the eyes, the ciliary muscles, iris dilator muscle, and iris sphincter muscle are types of smooth muscles. The iris dilator and sphincter muscles are contained in the iris and contract in order to dilate or constrict the pupils. The ciliary muscles change the shape of the lens to focus on objects in accommodation. In the skin, smooth muscle cells such as those of the arrector pili cause hair to stand erect in response to cold temperature and fear.

== Structure ==
=== Gross anatomy ===
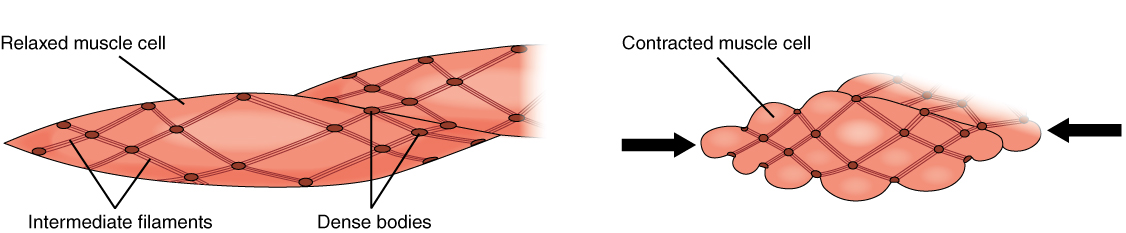
The dense bodies and intermediate filaments are networked through the sarcoplasm, which cause the muscle fiber to contract.

Smooth muscle is grouped into two types: single-unit smooth muscle, also known as visceral smooth muscle, and multiunit smooth muscle. Most smooth muscle is of the single-unit type, and is found in the walls of most internal organs (viscera); and lines blood vessels (except large elastic arteries), the urinary tract, and the digestive tract. It is not found in the heart which has cardiac muscle.

In single-unit smooth muscle a single cell in a bundle is innervated by an autonomic nerve fiber (myogenic). An action potential can be propagated through neighbouring muscle cells due to the presence of many gap junctions between the cells. Due to this property, single-unit bundles form a syncytium that contracts in a coordinated fashion making the whole muscle contract or relax, such as the uterine muscles during childbirth.

Single-unit visceral smooth muscle is myogenic; it can contract regularly without input from a motor neuron (as opposed to multiunit smooth muscle, which is neurogenic - that is, its contraction must be initiated by an autonomic nervous system neuron). A few of the cells in a given single unit may behave as pacemaker cells, generating rhythmic action potentials due to their intrinsic electrical activity. Because of its myogenic nature, single-unit smooth muscle is usually active, even when it is not receiving any neural stimulation. Multiunit smooth muscle is found in the trachea, in the iris of the eye, and lining the large elastic arteries.

However, the terms single- and multi-unit smooth muscle represent an oversimplification. This is due to the fact that smooth muscles for the most part are controlled and influenced by a combination of different neural elements. In addition, it has been observed that most of the time there will be some cell-to-cell communication and activators/inhibitors produced locally. This leads to a somewhat coordinated response even in multiunit smooth muscle.

Smooth muscle differs from skeletal muscle and cardiac muscle in terms of structure, function, regulation of contraction, and excitation-contraction coupling. However, smooth muscle tissue tends to demonstrate greater elasticity and function within a larger length-tension curve than striated muscle. This ability to stretch and still maintain contractility is important in organs like the intestines and urinary bladder. Smooth muscle in the gastrointestinal tract is activated by a composite of smooth muscle cells (SMCs), interstitial cells of Cajal (ICCs), and platelet-derived growth factor receptor alpha (PDGFRα) that are electrically coupled and work together as an SIP functional syncytium.

=== Microanatomy ===
==== Smooth muscle cells ====
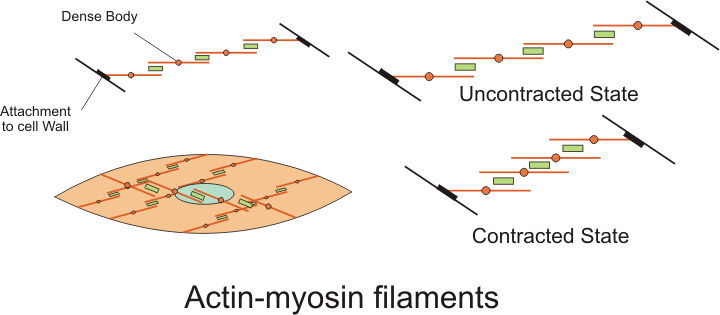

A smooth-muscle cell is a spindle-shaped myocyte with a wide middle and tapering ends, and a single nucleus. Like striated muscle, smooth muscle can tense and relax. In the relaxed state, each cell is 30–200 micrometers in length, some thousands of times shorter than a skeletal muscle cell. There are no myofibrils present, but much of the cytoplasm is taken up by the proteins, myosin and actin, which together have the capability to contract.

==== Myosin ====
Myosin is primarily class II in smooth muscle.

- Myosin II contains two heavy chains (MHC) which constitute the head and tail domains. Each of these heavy chains contains the N-terminal head domain, while the C-terminal tails take on a coiled-coil morphology, holding the two heavy chains together (imagine two snakes wrapped around each other, such as in a caduceus). Thus, myosin II has two heads. In smooth muscle, there is a single gene (MYH11) that codes for the heavy chains myosin II, but there are splice variants of this gene that result in four distinct isoforms. Also, smooth muscle may contain MHC that is not involved in contraction, and that can arise from multiple genes.
- Myosin II also contains 4 light chains (MLC), resulting in 2 per head, weighing 20 (MLC_{20}) and 17 (MLC_{17}) kDa. These bind the heavy chains in the "neck" region between the head and tail.
  - The MLC_{20} is also known as the regulatory light chain and actively participates in muscle contraction. Two MLC_{20} isoforms are found in smooth muscle, and they are encoded by different genes, but only one isoform participates in contraction.
  - The MLC_{17} is also known as the essential light chain. Its exact function is unclear, but it is believed that it contributes to the structural stability of the myosin head along with MLC_{20}. Two variants of MLC_{17} (MLC_{17a/b}) exist as a result of alternative splicing at the MLC_{17} gene.

Different combinations of heavy and light chains allow for up to hundreds of different types of myosin structures, but it is unlikely that more than a few such combinations are actually used or permitted within a specific smooth muscle bed. In the uterus, a shift in myosin expression has been hypothesized to avail for changes in the directions of uterine contractions that are seen during the menstrual cycle.

==== Actin ====
The thin filaments that are part of the contractile machinery are predominantly composed of alpha-actin and gamma-actin. Smooth muscle alpha-actin is the predominant isoform within smooth muscle. There is also a lot of actin (mainly beta-actin) that does not take part in contraction, but that polymerizes just below the plasma membrane in the presence of a contractile stimulant and may thereby assist in mechanical tension. Alpha-actin is also expressed as distinct genetic isoforms such as smooth muscle, cardiac muscle and skeletal muscle specific isoforms of alpha-actin.

The ratio of actin to myosin is between 2:1 and 10:1 in smooth muscle. Conversely, from a mass ratio standpoint (as opposed to a molar ratio), myosin is the dominant protein in striated skeletal muscle with the actin to myosin ratio falling in the 1:2 to 1:3 range. A typical value for healthy young adults is 1:2.2.

==== Other associated proteins ====
Smooth muscle does not contain the protein troponin; instead calmodulin (which takes on the regulatory role in smooth muscle), caldesmon and calponin are significant proteins expressed within smooth muscle.

- Tropomyosin is present in smooth muscle, spanning seven actin monomers and is laid out end to end over the entire length of the thin filaments. In striated muscle, tropomyosin serves to block actin–myosin interactions until calcium is present, but in smooth muscle, its function is unknown.
- Calponin molecules may exist in equal number as actin, and has been proposed to be a load-bearing protein.
- Caldesmon has been suggested to be involved in tethering actin, myosin and tropomyosin, and thereby enhance the ability of smooth muscle to maintain tension.

Also, all three of these proteins may have a role in inhibiting the ATPase activity of the myosin complex that otherwise provides energy to fuel muscle contraction.

==== Dense bodies ====
The actin filaments are attached to dense bodies, which are analogous to the Z-discs in striated muscle sarcomeres. Dense bodies are rich in alpha-actinin (α-actinin), and also attach intermediate filaments (consisting largely of vimentin and desmin), and thereby appear to serve as anchors from which the thin filaments can exert force. Dense bodies also are associated with beta-actin, which is the type found in the cytoskeleton, suggesting that dense bodies may coordinate tensions from both the contractile machinery and the cytoskeleton. Dense bodies appear darker under an electron microscope, and so they are sometimes described as electron dense.

The intermediate filaments are connected to other intermediate filaments via dense bodies, which eventually are attached to adherens junctions (also called focal adhesions) in the cell membrane of the smooth muscle cell, called the sarcolemma. The adherens junctions consist of large number of proteins including alpha-actinin (α-actinin), vinculin and cytoskeletal actin. The adherens junctions are scattered around dense bands that are circumfering the smooth muscle cell in a rib-like pattern. The dense band (or dense plaques) areas alternate with regions of membrane containing numerous caveolae. When complexes of actin and myosin contract, force is transduced to the sarcolemma through intermediate filaments attaching to such dense bands.

==== Contraction ====
During contraction, there is a spatial reorganization of the contractile machinery to optimize force development. Part of this reorganization consists of vimentin being phosphorylated at Ser^{56} by a p21 activated kinase, resulting in some disassembly of vimentin polymers.

Also, the number of myosin filaments is dynamic between the relaxed and contracted state in some tissues as the ratio of actin to myosin changes, and the length and number of myosin filaments change.

Isolated single smooth muscle cells have been observed contracting in a spiral corkscrew fashion, and isolated permeabilized smooth muscle cells adhered to glass (so contractile proteins allowed to internally contract) demonstrate zones of contractile protein interactions along the long axis as the cell contracts.

Smooth muscle-containing tissue needs to be stretched often, so elasticity is an important attribute of smooth muscle. Smooth muscle cells may secrete a complex extracellular matrix containing collagen (predominantly types I and III), elastin, glycoproteins, and proteoglycans. Smooth muscle also has specific elastin and collagen receptors to interact with these proteins of the extracellular matrix. These fibers with their extracellular matrices contribute to the viscoelasticity of these tissues. For example, the great arteries are viscoelastic vessels that act like a Windkessel, propagating ventricular contraction and smoothing out the pulsatile flow, and the smooth muscle within the tunica media contributes to this property.

==== Caveolae ====
The sarcolemma also contains caveolae, which are microdomains of lipid rafts specialized to cell signaling events and ion channels. These invaginations in the sarcoplasm contain a host of receptors (prostacyclin, endothelin, serotonin, muscarinic receptors, adrenergic receptors), second messenger generators (adenylate cyclase, phospholipase C), G proteins (RhoA, G alpha), kinases (rho kinase-ROCK, protein kinase C, protein Kinase A), ion channels (L type calcium channels, ATP sensitive potassium channels, calcium sensitive potassium channels) in close proximity. The caveolae are often close to sarcoplasmic reticulum or mitochondria, and have been proposed to organize signaling molecules in the membrane.

== Excitation-contraction coupling ==
A smooth muscle is excited by external stimuli, which causes contraction. Each step is further detailed below.

=== Inducing stimuli and factors ===
Smooth muscle may contract spontaneously (via ionic channel dynamics) or as in the gut special pacemakers cells interstitial cells of Cajal produce rhythmic contractions. Also, contraction, as well as relaxation, can be induced by a number of physiochemical agents (e.g., hormones, drugs, neurotransmitters – particularly from the autonomic nervous system).

Smooth muscle in various regions of the vascular tree, the airway and lungs, kidneys and vagina is different in their expression of ionic channels, hormone receptors, cell-signaling pathways, and other proteins that determine function.

==== External substances ====
For instance, blood vessels in skin, gastrointestinal system, kidney and brain respond to norepinephrine and epinephrine (from sympathetic stimulation or the adrenal medulla) by producing vasoconstriction (this response is mediated through alpha-1 adrenergic receptors). However, blood vessels within skeletal muscle and cardiac muscle respond to these catecholamines producing vasodilation because they possess beta-adrenergic receptors. So there is a difference in the distribution of the various adrenergic receptors that explains the difference in why blood vessels from different areas respond to the same agent norepinephrine/epinephrine differently as well as differences due to varying amounts of these catecholamines that are released and sensitivities of various receptors to concentrations.

Generally, arterial smooth muscle responds to carbon dioxide by producing vasodilation, and responds to oxygen by producing vasoconstriction. Pulmonary blood vessels within the lung are unique as they vasodilate to high oxygen tension and vasoconstrict when it falls. Bronchiole, smooth muscle that line the airways of the lung, respond to high carbon dioxide producing vasodilation and vasoconstrict when carbon dioxide is low. These responses to carbon dioxide and oxygen by pulmonary blood vessels and bronchiole airway smooth muscle aid in matching perfusion and ventilation within the lungs. Further different smooth muscle tissues display extremes of abundant to little sarcoplasmic reticulum so excitation-contraction coupling varies with its dependence on intracellular or extracellular calcium.

Recent research indicates that sphingosine-1-phosphate (S1P) signaling is an important regulator of vascular smooth muscle contraction. When transmural pressure increases, sphingosine kinase 1 phosphorylates sphingosine to S1P, which binds to the S1P2 receptor in plasma membrane of cells. This leads to a transient increase in intracellular calcium, and activates Rac and Rhoa signaling pathways. Collectively, these serve to increase MLCK activity and decrease MLCP activity, promoting muscle contraction. This allows arterioles to increase resistance in response to increased blood pressure and thus maintain constant blood flow. The Rhoa and Rac portion of the signaling pathway provides a calcium-independent way to regulate resistance artery tone.

=== Spread of impulse ===
To maintain organ dimensions against force, cells are fastened to one another by adherens junctions. As a consequence, cells are mechanically coupled to one another such that contraction of one cell invokes some degree of contraction in an adjoining cell. Gap junctions couple adjacent cells chemically and electrically, facilitating the spread of chemicals (e.g., calcium) or action potentials between smooth muscle cells. Single unit smooth muscle displays numerous gap junctions and these tissues often organize into sheets or bundles which contract in bulk.

=== Contraction ===
Smooth muscle contraction is caused by the sliding of myosin and actin filaments (a sliding filament mechanism) over each other. The energy for this to happen is provided by the hydrolysis of ATP. Myosin functions as an ATPase utilizing ATP to produce a molecular conformational change of part of the myosin and produces movement. Movement of the filaments over each other happens when the globular heads protruding from myosin filaments attach and interact with actin filaments to form crossbridges. The myosin heads tilt and drag along the actin filament a small distance (10–12 nm). The heads then release the actin filament and then changes angle to relocate to another site on the actin filament a further distance (10–12 nm) away. They can then re-bind to the actin molecule and drag it along further. This process is called crossbridge cycling and is the same for all muscles (see muscle contraction). Unlike cardiac and skeletal muscle, smooth muscle does not contain the calcium-binding protein troponin. Contraction is initiated by a calcium-regulated phosphorylation of myosin, rather than a calcium-activated troponin system.

Crossbridge cycling causes contraction of myosin and actin complexes, in turn causing increased tension along the entire chains of tensile structures, ultimately resulting in contraction of the entire smooth muscle tissue.

==== Phasic or tonic ====
Smooth muscle may contract phasically with rapid contraction and relaxation, or tonically with slow and sustained contraction. The reproductive, digestive, respiratory, and urinary tracts, skin, eye, and vasculature all contain this tonic muscle type. This type of smooth muscle can maintain force for prolonged time with only little energy utilization. There are differences in the myosin heavy and light chains that also correlate with these differences in contractile patterns and kinetics of contraction between tonic and phasic smooth muscle.

==== Activation of myosin heads ====
Crossbridge cycling cannot occur until the myosin heads have been activated to allow crossbridges to form. When the light chains are phosphorylated, they become active and will allow contraction to occur. The enzyme that phosphorylates the light chains is called myosin light-chain kinase (MLCK), also called MLC_{20} kinase. In order to control contraction, MLCK will work only when the muscle is stimulated to contract. Stimulation will increase the intracellular concentration of calcium ions. These bind to a molecule called calmodulin, and form a calcium-calmodulin complex. It is this complex that will bind to MLCK to activate it, allowing the chain of reactions for contraction to occur.

Activation consists of phosphorylation of a serine on position 19 (Ser19) on the MLC_{20} light chain, which causes a conformational change that increases the angle in the neck domain of the myosin heavy chain, which corresponds to the part of the cross-bridge cycle where the myosin head is unattached to the actin filament and relocates to another site on it. After attachment of the myosin head to the actin filament, this serine phosphorylation also activates the ATPase activity of the myosin head region to provide the energy to fuel the subsequent contraction. Phosphorylation of a threonine on position 18 (Thr18) on MLC20 is also possible and may further increase the ATPase activity of the myosin complex.

==== Sustained maintenance ====
Phosphorylation of the MLC_{20} myosin light chains correlates well with the shortening velocity of smooth muscle. During this period there is a rapid burst of energy utilization as measured by oxygen consumption. Within a few minutes of initiation the calcium level markedly decrease, MLC_{20} myosin light chains phosphorylation decreases, and energy utilization decreases and the muscle can relax. Still, smooth muscle has the ability of sustained maintenance of force in this situation as well. This sustained phase has been attributed to certain myosin crossbridges, termed latch-bridges, that are cycling very slowly, notably slowing the progression to the cycle stage whereby dephosphorylated myosin detaches from the actin, thereby maintaining the force at low energy costs. This phenomenon is of great value especially for tonically active smooth muscle.

Isolated preparations of vascular and visceral smooth muscle contract with depolarizing high potassium balanced saline generating a certain amount of contractile force. The same preparation stimulated in normal balanced saline with an agonist such as endothelin or serotonin will generate more contractile force. This increase in force is termed calcium sensitization. The myosin light chain phosphatase is inhibited to increase the gain or sensitivity of myosin light chain kinase to calcium. There are a number of cell signalling pathways believed to regulate this decrease in myosin light chain phosphatase: a RhoA-Rock kinase pathway, a Protein kinase C-Protein kinase C potentiation inhibitor protein 17 (CPI-17) pathway, telokin, and a Zip kinase pathway. Further Rock kinase and Zip kinase have been implicated to directly phosphorylate the 20kd myosin light chains.

==== Other contractile mechanisms ====
Other cell signaling pathways and protein kinases (Protein kinase C, Rho kinase, Zip kinase, Focal adhesion kinases) have been implicated as well and actin polymerization dynamics plays a role in force maintenance. While myosin light chain phosphorylation correlates well with shortening velocity, other cell signaling pathways have been implicated in the development of force and maintenance of force. Notably the phosphorylation of specific tyrosine residues on the focal adhesion adapter protein-paxillin by specific tyrosine kinases has been demonstrated to be essential to force development and maintenance. For example, cyclic nucleotides can relax arterial smooth muscle without reductions in crossbridge phosphorylation, a process termed force suppression. This process is mediated by the phosphorylation of the small heat shock protein, hsp20, and may prevent phosphorylated myosin heads from interacting with actin.

=== Relaxation ===
The phosphorylation of the light chains by MLCK is countered by a myosin light-chain phosphatase, which dephosphorylates the MLC_{20} myosin light chains and thereby inhibits contraction. Other signaling pathways have also been implicated in the regulation actin and myosin dynamics. In general, the relaxation of smooth muscle is by cell-signaling pathways that increase the myosin phosphatase activity, decrease the intracellular calcium levels, hyperpolarize the smooth muscle, and/or regulate actin and myosin muscle can be mediated by the endothelium-derived relaxing factor-nitric oxide, endothelial derived hyperpolarizing factor (either an endogenous cannabinoid, cytochrome P450 metabolite, or hydrogen peroxide), or prostacyclin (PGI2). Nitric oxide and PGI2 stimulate soluble guanylate cyclase and membrane bound adenylate cyclase, respectively. The cyclic nucleotides (cGMP and cAMP) produced by these cyclases activate Protein Kinase G and Protein Kinase A and phosphorylate a number of proteins. The phosphorylation events lead to a decrease in intracellular calcium (inhibit L type Calcium channels, inhibits IP3 receptor channels, stimulates sarcoplasmic reticulum Calcium pump ATPase), a decrease in the 20kd myosin light chain phosphorylation by altering calcium sensitization and increasing myosin light chain phosphatase activity, a stimulation of calcium sensitive potassium channels which hyperpolarize the cell, and the phosphorylation of amino acid residue serine 16 on the small heat shock protein (hsp20)by Protein Kinases A and G. The phosphorylation of hsp20 appears to alter actin and focal adhesion dynamics and actin-myosin interaction, and recent evidence indicates that hsp20 binding to 14-3-3 protein is involved in this process. An alternative hypothesis is that phosphorylated Hsp20 may also alter the affinity of phosphorylated myosin with actin and inhibit contractility by interfering with crossbridge formation. The endothelium derived hyperpolarizing factor stimulates calcium sensitive potassium channels and/or ATP sensitive potassium channels and stimulate potassium efflux which hyperpolarizes the cell and produces relaxation.

== Invertebrate smooth muscle ==
In invertebrate smooth muscle, contraction is initiated with the binding of calcium directly to myosin and then rapidly cycling cross-bridges, generating force. Similar to the mechanism of vertebrate smooth muscle, there is a low calcium and low energy utilization catch phase. This sustained phase or catch phase has been attributed to a catch protein that has similarities to myosin light-chain kinase and the elastic protein-titin called twitchin. Clams and other bivalve mollusks use this catch phase of smooth muscle to keep their shell closed for prolonged periods with little energy usage.

== Specific effects ==
Although the structure and function is basically the same in smooth muscle cells in different organs, their specific effects or end-functions differ.

The contractile function of vascular smooth muscle regulates the lumenal diameter of the small arteries-arterioles called resistance arteries, thereby contributing significantly to setting the level of blood pressure and blood flow to vascular beds. Smooth muscle contracts slowly and may maintain the contraction (tonically) for prolonged periods in blood vessels, bronchioles, and some sphincters. Activating arteriole smooth muscle can decrease the lumenal diameter 1/3 of resting so it drastically alters blood flow and resistance. Activation of aortic smooth muscle doesn't significantly alter the lumenal diameter but serves to increase the viscoelasticity of the vascular wall.

In the digestive tract, smooth muscle contracts in a rhythmic peristaltic fashion, rhythmically forcing foodstuffs through the digestive tract as the result of phasic contraction.

A non-contractile function is seen in specialized smooth muscle within the afferent arteriole of the juxtaglomerular apparatus, which secretes renin in response to osmotic and pressure changes, and also it is believed to secrete ATP in tubuloglomerular regulation of glomerular filtration rate. Renin in turn activates the renin–angiotensin system to regulate blood pressure.

== Growth and rearrangement ==
The mechanism in which external factors stimulate growth and rearrangement is not yet fully understood. A number of growth factors and neurohumoral agents influence smooth muscle growth and differentiation. The Notch receptor and cell-signaling pathway have been demonstrated to be essential to vasculogenesis and the formation of arteries and veins. The proliferation is implicated in the pathogenesis of atherosclerosis and is inhibited by nitric oxide.

The embryological origin of smooth muscle is usually of mesodermal origin, after the creation of muscle cells in a process known as myogenesis. However, the smooth muscle within the Aorta and Pulmonary arteries (the Great Arteries of the heart) is derived from ectomesenchyme of neural crest origin, although coronary artery smooth muscle is of mesodermal origin.

== Related diseases ==
Multisystemic smooth muscle dysfunction syndrome is a genetic condition in which the body of a developing embryo does not create enough smooth muscle for the gastrointestinal system. This condition is fatal.

Anti-smooth muscle antibodies (ASMA) can be a symptom of an auto-immune disorder, such as hepatitis, cirrhosis, or lupus.

Smooth muscle tumors are most commonly benign, and are then called leiomyomas. They can occur in any organ, but they usually occur in the uterus, small bowel, and esophagus. Malignant smooth muscle tumors are called leiomyosarcomas. Leiomyosarcomas are one of the more common types of soft-tissue sarcomas. Vascular smooth muscle tumors are very rare. They can be malignant or benign, and morbidity can be significant with either type. Intravascular leiomyomatosis is a benign neoplasm that extends through the veins; angioleiomyoma is a benign neoplasm of the extremities; vascular leiomyosarcomas is a malignant neoplasm that can be found in the inferior vena cava, pulmonary arteries and veins, and other peripheral vessels. See Atherosclerosis.

== See also ==
- Atromentin has been shown to be a smooth muscle stimulant.
- Myogenic mechanism
- List of distinct cell types in the adult human body
