= Monckeberg's arteriosclerosis =

Type of artery-hardening disease

Mönckeberg's sclerosis
- Other names: Medial calcific sclerosis or Mönckeberg medial sclerosis
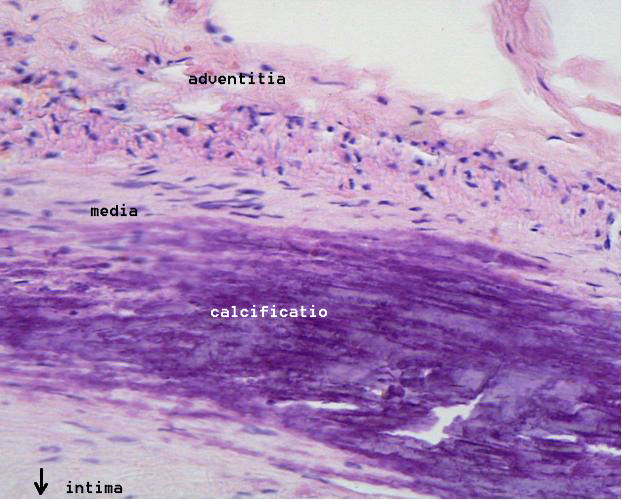
- Microphotography of arterial wall with calcified (violet colour) atherosclerotic plaque (haematoxylin & eosin stain)
- Specialty: Cardiology

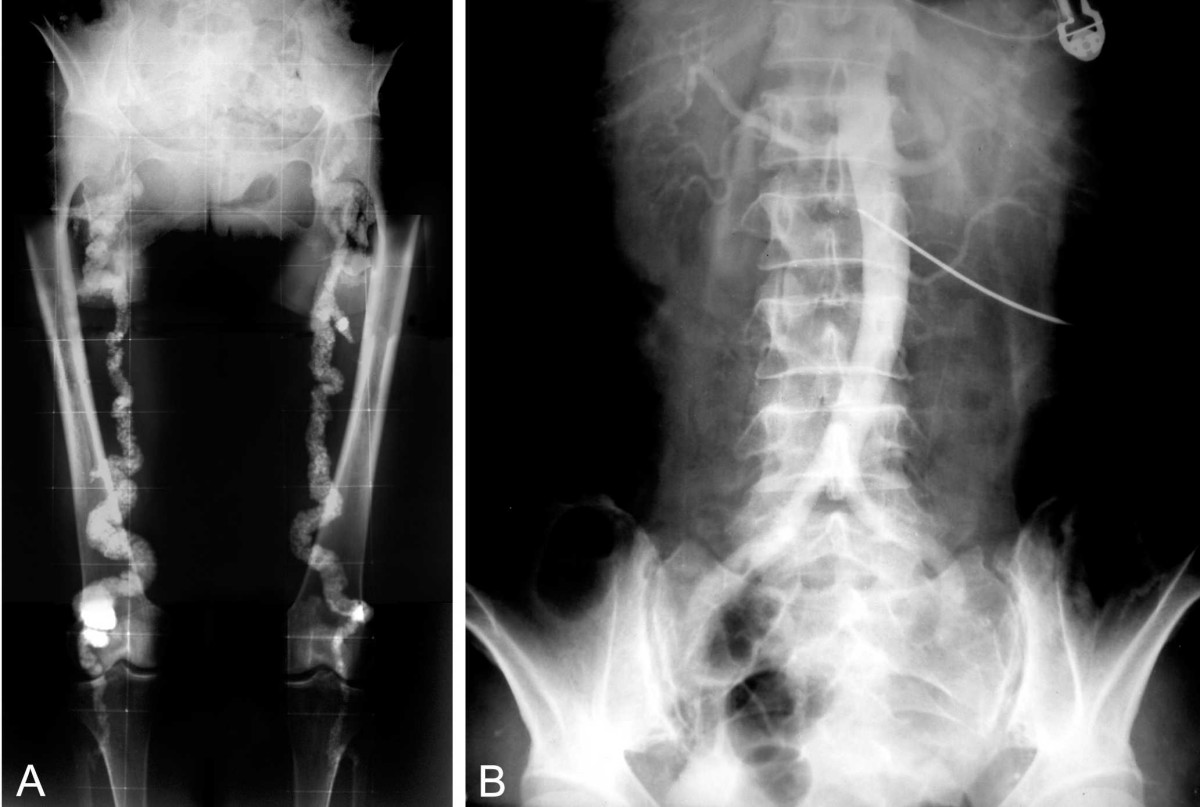
A. Pelvic and lower extremity radiograph shows extensive calcification of the femoral arteries. B. Translumbar aortography shows near-total obstruction of the femoral arteries.

Mönckeberg's arteriosclerosis, or Mönckeberg's sclerosis, is a non-inflammatory form of arteriosclerosis (artery hardening), which differs from atherosclerosis traditionally. Calcium deposits are found in the muscular middle layer of the walls of arteries (the tunica media) with no obstruction of the lumen. It is an example of dystrophic calcification. This condition occurs as an age-related degenerative process. However, it can occur in pseudoxanthoma elasticum and idiopathic arterial calcification of infancy as a pathological condition, as well. Its clinical significance and cause are not well understood and its relationship to atherosclerosis and other forms of vascular calcification are the subject of disagreement. Mönckeberg's arteriosclerosis is named after Johann Georg Mönckeberg, who first described it in 1903.

The severity of calcium deposits formed by Mönckeberg's arteriosclerosis can be categorized into stages based on the histological appearance. Understanding these stages can help to understand disease progression and how the disease is caused. Stage 1 involves the formation of calcium deposits both inside and outside the vascular smooth muscle cells which compose the tunica media. Calcification outside of the vascular smooth muscle cells are commonly associated with damage to elastic fibers in the extra-cellular matrix. These calcium deposits also develop on the internal elastic lamina. Stage 2 and Stage 3 involve the formation of calcified sheaths spanning an increased diameter through the tunica media. Stage 4 then involves the formation of bony tissue from these calcifications through the process of osseous metaplasia.

== Pathophysiology ==
The exact pathophysiology of Monckeberg's arteriosclerosis remains uncertain. However, it is thought that the condition arises from the fatty degeneration of smooth muscle cells within the arterial media, leading to the formation of a mass that undergoes hyaline degeneration and eventually calcification. Typically, this results in minimal clinical impact due to the small reduction in the arterial lumen. However, if atherosclerosis also occurs, the clinical symptoms become more pronounced and severe.

Monckeberg's calcification typically occurs near the internal elastic lamina or, less frequently, in the media of muscular arteries without alterations in calcium metabolism. Its clinical importance is not yet fully understood. Some recent studies suggest a connection between Monckeberg's calcification and metabolic vascular calcification. However, another study, which examined 143 histologically normal femoral arteries from young, healthy multi-organ donors, suggests otherwise. This study found that 25% of participants, with a mean age of 38 years (ranging from 14 to 59 years), had Monckeberg's calcification without any cardiovascular disease risk factors. This indicates that Monckeberg's calcification may develop early in life, potentially due to abnormal osteogenic differentiation of vascular progenitor cells.

== Signs and symptoms ==
Typically, Mönckeberg's arteriosclerosis is not associated with symptoms unless complicated by atherosclerosis, calciphylaxis, or accompanied by some other disease. However, the presence of Mönckeberg's arteriosclerosis is associated with poorer prognosis. This is probably due to vascular calcification causing increased arterial stiffness, increased pulse pressure and resulting in exaggerated damage to the heart and kidneys. The clinical symptoms of Mönckeberg's arteriosclerosis are similar to giant cell arteritis in which the two can be mistakenly interchanged. A temporal artery biopsy (TAB) can be performed to differentiate between the two disease states. As the disease progresses, the arteriosclerosis results in the obstruction of normal blood flow, and potentially the formation of blood clots. This can result in changes in blood pressure, and depending on the severity of the calcification organ ischemia. In rare instances, headaches and facial pain have also been reported by patients with Mönckeberg's arteriosclerosis.

Mönckeberg's arteriosclerosis may also be a risk factor for the development of cranial infarctions. Intercranial Mönckeberg's arteriosclerosis has been commonly found in people with malignant tumors who died of cerebral infarctions. In cranial autopsies, areas of Mönckeberg's arteriosclerosis were located near the sites of infarction.

Mönckeberg's arteriosclerosis has little or no impact on the risk of microvascular surgery. Mönckeberg's arteriosclerosis is typically an incidental finding, detected through clinical examination or plain radiography, and may be associated with diabetes mellitus or chronic kidney disease. The condition is characterized by calcification of the tunica media, leading to hardened, pulseless vessels that often still provide normal distal perfusion, unlike atherosclerosis where the tunica intima is affected and the vessel lumen diameter is compromised. Despite its prevalence being less than 1% of the population, Mönckeberg's arteriosclerosis generally does not adversely affect the outcome of microvascular surgery, as evidenced by successful free flap reconstructions using these vessels with minimal impact on flap survival.

== Cause ==
Minor degrees of calcification of the cardiovascular system are common in elderly people, usually individuals over 50 years old, and the prevalence of vascular calcification is increased by some diseases (see Epidemiology section). Vascular calcification results from the deposition of calcium phosphate crystals (hydroxyapatite) as a consequence of disordered calcium phosphate regulation in the blood vessel. Hydroxyapatite is secreted in vesicles that bleb out from vascular smooth muscle cells or pericytes in the arterial wall. The mechanism of vascular calcification is not fully understood, but probably involves a phenotypic change in the vascular smooth muscle cells in the wall with activation of bone-forming programs. Numerous regulators of calcification such as osteopontin, osteoprotegerin, matrix gla protein and fetuin-A, receptor activator of NF-kappa-B, receptor activator of NF-kappa-B ligand and tumor necrosis factor (TNF)-related apoptosis-inducing ligand protein have been implicated in this process. In addition, elevated inorganic phosphate may have direct signaling effects which can induce the progression of Mönckeberg's arteriosclerosis. Elevated inorganic phosphate (a result of phosphorus imbalance) induces intercellular signaling mechanisms in the smooth muscle, which can both induce smooth muscle cell apoptosis and medial calcification. This mechanism could help to further describe the relationship between uremia, such as in patients with ESRD, and development of Mönckeberg's arteriosclerosis.

It is unclear whether Mönckeberg's arteriosclerosis is a distinct entity or forms part of a spectrum of vascular calcification that includes atherosclerosis and calcification in the inner layer of the artery wall (tunica intima), calcification of the internal elastic lamina, calcification of cardiac valves and widespread soft tissue calcification. The existence of Mönckeberg's arteriosclerosis has been disputed and it has been proposed that it is a part of a continuum of atherosclerotic disease: the majority of atherosclerotic plaques contain some calcium deposits and calcification of the internal elastic lamina is common in pathological specimens labelled as Mönckeberg's arteriosclerosis. However, studies in animals suggest that there is mainly a medial pattern of vascular calcification reflects different underlying mechanisms of disease, and despite involvement of the internal elastic lamina, evidence of inflammation is rare in Mönckeberg's arteriosclerosis.

== Diagnosis ==
Diagnosis of this rare disease is often misdiagnosed or delayed, leading to results such as amputation and death. In a rare case, an 80 year old woman displayed symptoms resembling temporal arteritis. However, pathological findings confirmed that it was Mönckeberg's arteriosclerosis instead. Due to this, it is important to utilize comprehensive medical testing, examination, and diagnostic tests. Often Mönckeberg's arteriosclerosis is discovered as an incidental finding in an X-ray radiograph, on mammograms, in autopsy, or in association with investigation of some other disease, such as diabetes mellitus or chronic kidney disease. The diagnosis is usually confirmed by a radiography result or an ultrasonography. Typically calcification is observed in the arteries of the upper and lower limb although it has been seen in numerous other medium size arteries. In the radial or ulnar arteries it can cause "pipestem" arteries, which present as a bounding pulse at the end of the calcific zone. It may also result in "pulselessness."

Epidemiological studies have used the ratio of ankle to brachial blood pressure (ankle brachial pressure index, ABPI or ABI) as an indicator of arterial calcification with ABPI >1.3 to >1.5 being used as a diagnostic criterion depending on the study. However this type of non-invasive diagnostic tool could lead to falsely elevated values, especially individuals with diabetes that have lower limb ischemia. In an observational study, 11% of patients that met the criteria of diabetes and critical ischemia had exhibited false ABI levels. It was found that the calcification of the arteries could potentially cause misuse of the sphygmomanometer since the calcified arteries would make it more difficult to compress.

== Management and prevention ==
=== Guidelines and recent studies ===
Currently, there are no guideline therapies established to treat Mönckeberg's arteriosclerosis. There have been more studies as of recently to learn more about the disease and potential pharmacological managements. Recent studies that are showing potential emerging therapies that can help treat arteriosclerosis. A therapy using vasostatin-1, which is a chromogranin A derived peptide, has shown potential in helping treat Mönckeberg's arteriosclerosis. There are still further discussions and trials needed to help define treatment goals for Mönckeberg's arteriosclerosis.

=== Medications ===
There are some recommendations for the clinical treatment for people who have complications related to Mönckeberg's arteriosclerosis. Specifically for people with underlying phosphate disorders, the use of phosphate binders, low-dose vitamin D, calcimimetics, magnesium, bisphosphonates, sodium thiosulfate, and aldosterone antagonists have been proposed. Lowering calcium and phosphate levels in people with calciphylaxis, along with increasing hemodialysis and treating potential ischemic necrosis is also recommended.

=== Prevention ===
Since Mönckeberg's arteriosclerosis is more commonly associated with individuals that have diabetes mellitus and chronic kidney disease, prevention methods can be associated with those disease states. The most fundamental therapeutic goal in prevention would be to lower an individuals risk of cardiovascular events. This can be done by eliminating or controlling risk factors such as smoking or tobacco use, obesity, lack of physical activity, diabetes, hypertension, chronic kidney disease, chronic inflammatory conditions, systemic lupus erythematosus, and hypercholesterolemia.

Since Mönckeberg's arteriosclerosis is not well understood more research is needed to further understandings of how this disease state comes about and treatment methods for it. Some promising studies have been exploring this concept and have created 3D printed tubular structures similar to the human body's own vasculature to use as a model for testing.

== Epidemiology ==
The prevalence of Mönckeberg's arteriosclerosis increases with age and is more frequent in diabetes mellitus, chronic kidney disease, systemic lupus erythematosus, chronic inflammatory conditions, hypervitaminosis D (high vitamin D) and rare genetic disorders, such as Keutel syndrome. The prevalence of Mönckeberg's arteriosclerosis in the general population has been estimated as <1% on the basis of an ankle brachial pressure index >1.5; however the validity of this criterion is questionable. Increased use of long term corticosteroids have also been implicated in the development of Mönckeberg's arteriosclerosis.

Animal studies have also suggested genetics may have a role in the development of Mönckeberg arteriosclerosis. Specific genetic mutations in the cardiovascular related genes VKORC1, NT5E, and ABCC6 have a potential role in the development of the disease.
