= Familial thoracic aortic aneurysm =

- Other names: Familial aortic dissection, cystic medial necrosis of aorta
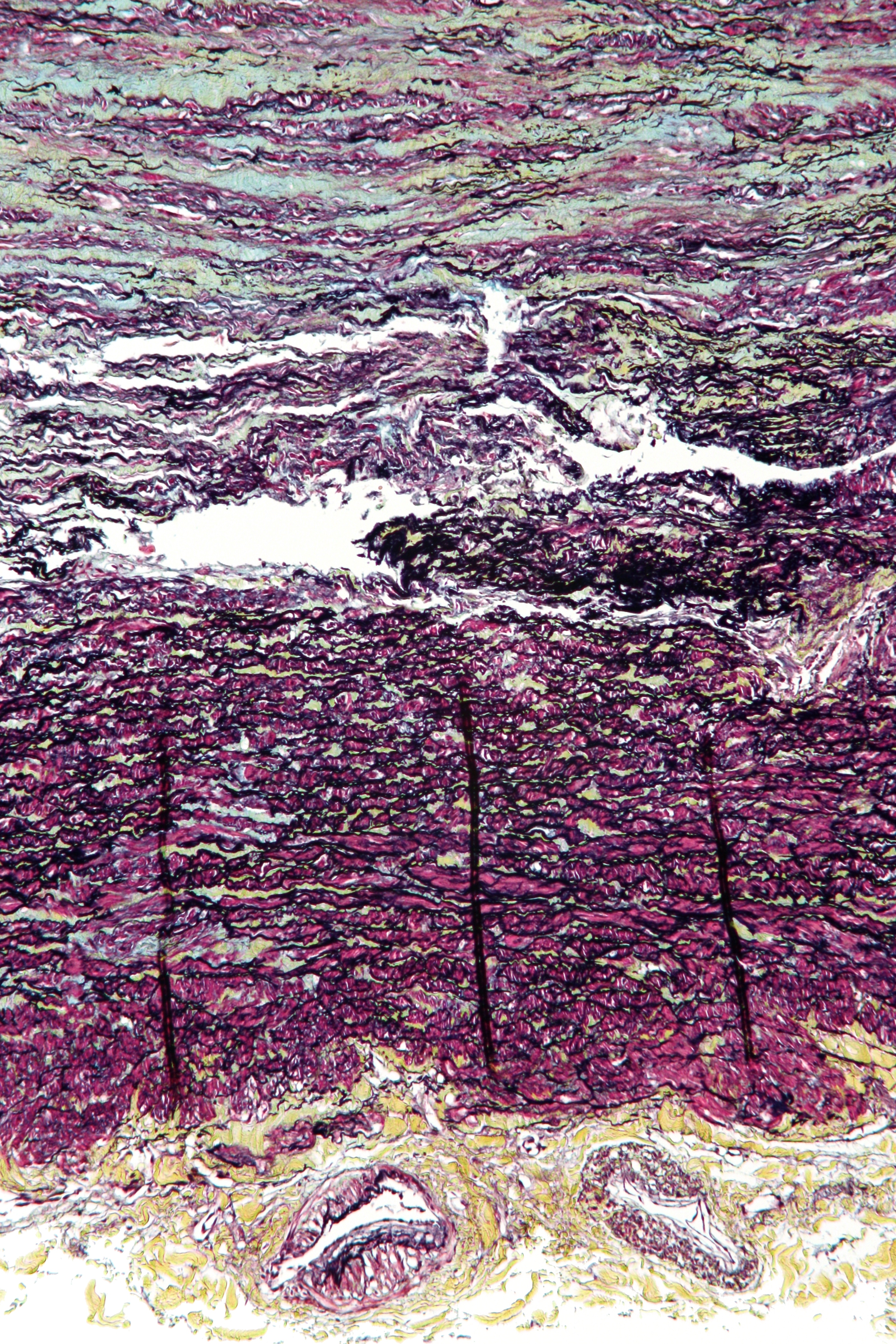
- Micrograph showing cystic medial degeneration, the histologic correlate of familial thoracic aortic aneurysms. The image shows abundant basophilic ground substance in the tunica media (blue at top of image) and disruption of the elastic fibers. The tunica adventitia (yellow at bottom of image) with vaso vasorum is also seen. Movat's stain.

Familial thoracic aortic aneurysm is an autosomal dominant disorder of large arteries.

There is an association between familial thoracic aortic aneurysm and Marfan syndrome as well as other hereditary connective tissue disorders.

== Signs and symptoms ==
A degenerative breakdown of collagen, elastin, and smooth muscle caused by aging contributes to weakening of the wall of the artery.

In the aorta, this can result in the formation of a fusiform aneurysm. There is also increased risk of aortic dissection.

== Genetics ==
Types include:

Type	OMIM	Gene	Locus
AAT1	607086		11q23.3-q24
AAT4	132900	MYH11	16p
AAT6	611788	ACTA2	10q

== Diagnosis ==
The diagnosis of familial thoracic aortic aneurysm is established through a combination of clinical evaluation, imaging studies, and genetic testing. Patients especially those with a relevant family history are typically evaluated using noninvasive imaging modalities such as Transthoracic echocardiography and Computed tomography, which can accurately assess aortic dimensions and detect early dilatation. In selected instances, Magnetic resonance imaging (MRI) is utilized for high-resolution imaging of the aortic wall. Additionally, genetic testing for pathogenic variants in genes such as FBN1 and ACTA2 may confirm a familial predisposition to aortic pathology. Early detection is critical for risk stratification and timely intervention, thereby reducing the likelihood of progression to dissection or rupture.

== Treatment ==
Management of familial thoracic aortic aneurysm involves both medical and surgical interventions, tailored to the patient’s aortic dimensions, progression rate, and underlying genetic predisposition. Medical therapy primarily aims to reduce hemodynamic stress on the aortic wall through the use of Beta blockers and Angiotensin receptor blockers, which help in controlling blood pressure and heart rate. Regular imaging surveillance using modalities such as Transthoracic echocardiography and Computed tomography is essential for monitoring aneurysm progression. Surgical repair is recommended when the aneurysm reaches a critical diameter or shows rapid expansion; the choice of procedure depends on the extent and location of the dilatation. Emerging strategies, including gene-directed therapies and novel molecular targets, are under investigation to improve long-term outcomes in this high-risk population.

== Terminology ==
It is sometimes called "Erdheim cystic medial necrosis of aorta", after Jakob Erdheim.

The term "cystic medial degeneration" is sometimes used instead of "cystic medial necrosis", because necrosis is not always found.
