= Blood vessel =

Tubular structure carrying blood

- Diagram blood vessel

Details
- System: Circulatory system

Identifiers
- Latin: vas sanguineum
- MeSH: D001808
- TA98: A12.0.00.001
- TA2: 3895
- FMA: 63183

Blood vessels are the tubular structures of a circulatory system transporting blood in animal bodies. Blood vessels transport blood cells, nutrients, and oxygen to most of the tissues of a body, and also transport waste products and carbon dioxide away from the tissues. Some tissues – such as cartilage, epithelium, and the lens and cornea of the eye – are not supplied with blood vessels, so are termed avascular.

There are five types of blood vessels: the arteries, which carry the blood away from the heart; the arterioles; the capillaries, where the exchange of water and chemicals between the blood and tissues occurs; the venules; and the veins, which carry blood from the capillaries back towards the heart.

The word, vascular, is derived from the Latin vas, meaning vessel, and is used in reference to blood vessels.

== Etymology ==
artery – late Middle English; from Latin arteria, from Greek artēria, probably derived from airein ("raise").

vein – Middle English; from Old French veine, from Latin vena.

capillary – mid-17th century; from Latin capillaris, from capillus ("hair"), influenced by Old French capillaire.

== Structure ==
The arteries and veins have three layers. The middle layer (tunica media) is thicker in the arteries than it is in the veins:

- The inner layer, tunica intima, is the thinnest layer. It is a single layer of flat cells (simple squamous epithelium) glued by a polysaccharide intercellular matrix, surrounded by a thin layer of subendothelial connective tissue interlaced with a number of circularly arranged elastic bands called the internal elastic lamina. A thin membrane of elastic fibers in the tunica intima runs parallel to the vessel.
- The middle layer of tunica media is the thickest layer in arteries. It consists of circularly arranged elastic fiber, connective tissue and polysaccharide substances; the second and third layer are separated by another thick elastic band called external elastic lamina. The tunica media may (especially in arteries) be rich in vascular smooth muscle, which controls the caliber of the vessel. Veins do not have the external elastic lamina, but only an internal one. The tunica media is thicker in the arteries rather than the veins.
- The outer layer is the tunica adventitia and the thickest layer in veins. It is entirely made of connective tissue. It also contains nerves that supply the vessel as well as nutrient capillaries (vasa vasorum) in the larger blood vessels.

Capillaries consist of a single layer of endothelial cells with a supporting subendothelium consisting of a basement membrane and connective tissue. When blood vessels connect to form a region of diffuse vascular supply, it is called an anastomosis. Anastomoses provide alternative routes for blood to flow through in case of blockages. Veins can have valves that prevent the backflow of the blood that was being pumped against gravity by the surrounding muscles. In humans, arteries do not have valves except for the two 'arteries' that originate from the heart's ventricles.

Early estimates by Danish physiologist August Krogh suggested that the total length of capillaries in human muscles could reach approximately 100,000 kilometres (62,000 mi) (assuming a high muscle mass human body, like that of a bodybuilder). However, later studies suggest a more conservative figure of 9,000–19,000 kilometres (5,600–11,800 mi) taking into account updated capillary density and average muscle mass in adults.

=== Types ===
There are various kinds of blood vessels:

- Arteries
  - Elastic arteries
  - Distributing arteries
  - Arterioles
- Capillaries (smallest type of blood vessels)
- Venules
- Veins
  - Large collecting vessels, such as the subclavian vein, the jugular vein, the renal vein and the iliac vein.
  - Venae cavae (the two largest veins, carry blood into the heart).
- Sinusoids
  - Extremely small vessels located within bone marrow, the spleen and the liver.

They are roughly grouped as "arterial" and "venous", determined by whether the blood in it is flowing away from (arterial) or toward (venous) the heart. The term "arterial blood" is nevertheless used to indicate blood high in oxygen, although the pulmonary artery carries "venous blood" and blood flowing in the pulmonary vein is rich in oxygen. This is because they are carrying the blood to and from the lungs, respectively, to be oxygenated.

== Function ==
Blood vessels function to transport blood to an animal's body tissues. In general, arteries and arterioles transport oxygenated blood from the lungs to the body and its organs, and veins and venules transport deoxygenated blood from the body to the lungs. Blood vessels also circulate blood throughout the circulatory system. Oxygen (bound to hemoglobin in red blood cells) is the most critical nutrient carried by the blood. In all arteries apart from the pulmonary artery, hemoglobin is highly saturated (95–100%) with oxygen. In all veins, apart from the pulmonary vein, the saturation of hemoglobin is about 75%. (The values are reversed in the pulmonary circulation.) In addition to carrying oxygen, blood also carries hormones, and nutrients to the cells of a body and removes waste products.

Blood vessels do not actively engage in the transport of blood (they have no appreciable peristalsis). Blood is propelled through arteries and arterioles through pressure generated by the heartbeat. Blood vessels also transport red blood cells. Hematocrit tests can be performed to calculate the proportion of red blood cells in the blood. Higher proportions result in conditions such as dehydration or heart disease, while lower proportions could lead to anemia and long-term blood loss.

Permeability of the endothelium is pivotal in the release of nutrients to the tissue. It is also increased in inflammation in response to histamine, prostaglandins and interleukins, which leads to most of the symptoms of inflammation (swelling, redness, warmth and pain).

=== Constriction ===
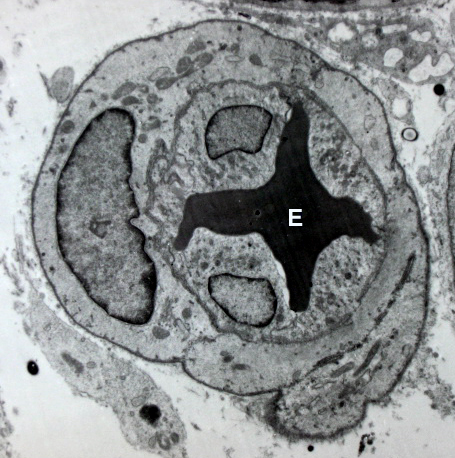
Transmission electron micrograph of a microvessel displaying an erythrocyte (E) within its lumen which is deformed due to vasoconstriction

Arteries—and veins to a degree—can regulate their inner diameter by contraction of the muscular layer. This changes the blood flow to downstream organs and is determined by the autonomic nervous system. Vasodilation and vasoconstriction are also used antagonistically as methods of thermoregulation.

The size of blood vessels is different for each of them. It ranges from a diameter of about 30–25 millimeters for the aorta to only about 5 micrometers (0,005 mm) for the capillaries. Vasoconstriction is the constriction of blood vessels (narrowing, becoming smaller in cross-sectional area) by contracting the vascular smooth muscle in the vessel walls. It is regulated by vasoconstrictors (agents that cause vasoconstriction). These can include paracrine factors (e.g., prostaglandins), a number of hormones (e.g., vasopressin and angiotensin) and neurotransmitters (e.g., epinephrine) from the nervous system.

Vasodilation is a similar process mediated by antagonistically acting mediators. The most prominent vasodilator is nitric oxide (termed endothelium-derived relaxing factor for this reason).

=== Flow ===
The circulatory system uses the channel of blood vessels to deliver blood to all parts of the body. This is a result of the left and right sides of the heart working together to allow blood to flow continuously to the lungs and other parts of the body. Oxygen-poor blood enters the right side of the heart through two large veins. Oxygen-rich blood from the lungs enters through the pulmonary veins on the left side of the heart into the aorta and then reaches the rest of the body. The capillaries are responsible for allowing the blood to receive oxygen through tiny air sacs in the lungs. This is also the site where carbon dioxide exits the blood. This all occurs in the lungs where blood is oxygenated.

The blood pressure in blood vessels is traditionally expressed in millimetres of mercury (1 mmHg = 133 Pa). In the arterial system, this is usually around 120 mmHg systolic (high pressure wave due to contraction of the heart) and 80 mmHg diastolic (low pressure wave). In contrast, pressures in the venous system are constant and rarely exceed 10 mmHg.

Vascular resistance occurs when the vessels away from the heart oppose the flow of blood. Resistance is an accumulation of three different factors: blood viscosity, blood vessel length and vessel radius. Blood viscosity is the thickness of the blood and its resistance to flow as a result of the different components of the blood. Blood is 92% water by weight and the rest of blood is composed of protein, nutrients, electrolytes, wastes, and dissolved gases. Depending on the health of an individual, the blood viscosity can vary (i.e., anemia causing relatively lower concentrations of protein, high blood pressure an increase in dissolved salts or lipids, etc.).

Vessel length is the total length of the vessel measured as the distance away from the heart. As the total length of the vessel increases, the total resistance as a result of friction will increase. Vessel radius also affects the total resistance as a result of contact with the vessel wall. As the radius of the wall gets smaller, the proportion of the blood making contact with the wall will increase. The greater amount of contact with the wall will increase the total resistance against the blood flow.

== Disease ==
Blood vessels play a role in virtually every medical condition. Cancer, for example, cannot progress unless the tumor causes angiogenesis (formation of new blood vessels) to supply its metabolic demand. Atherosclerosis represents around 85% of all deaths from cardiovascular diseases due to plaque formation. Coronary artery disease that often follows after atherosclerosis can cause heart attacks or cardiac arrest, resulting in 919,032 deaths in the United States in 2023. In 2019, around 17.9 million people died from cardiovascular diseases worldwide. Of these deaths, around 85% of them were due to heart attack and stroke.

Blood vessel inflammation may lead to hemorrhage due to mechanical damage in the vessel endothelium. Anti-inflammatory treatment may require multiple therapies to control blood lipids, inflammatory cytokines, and blood clots.
