= Vasa vasorum =

Network of small blood vessels

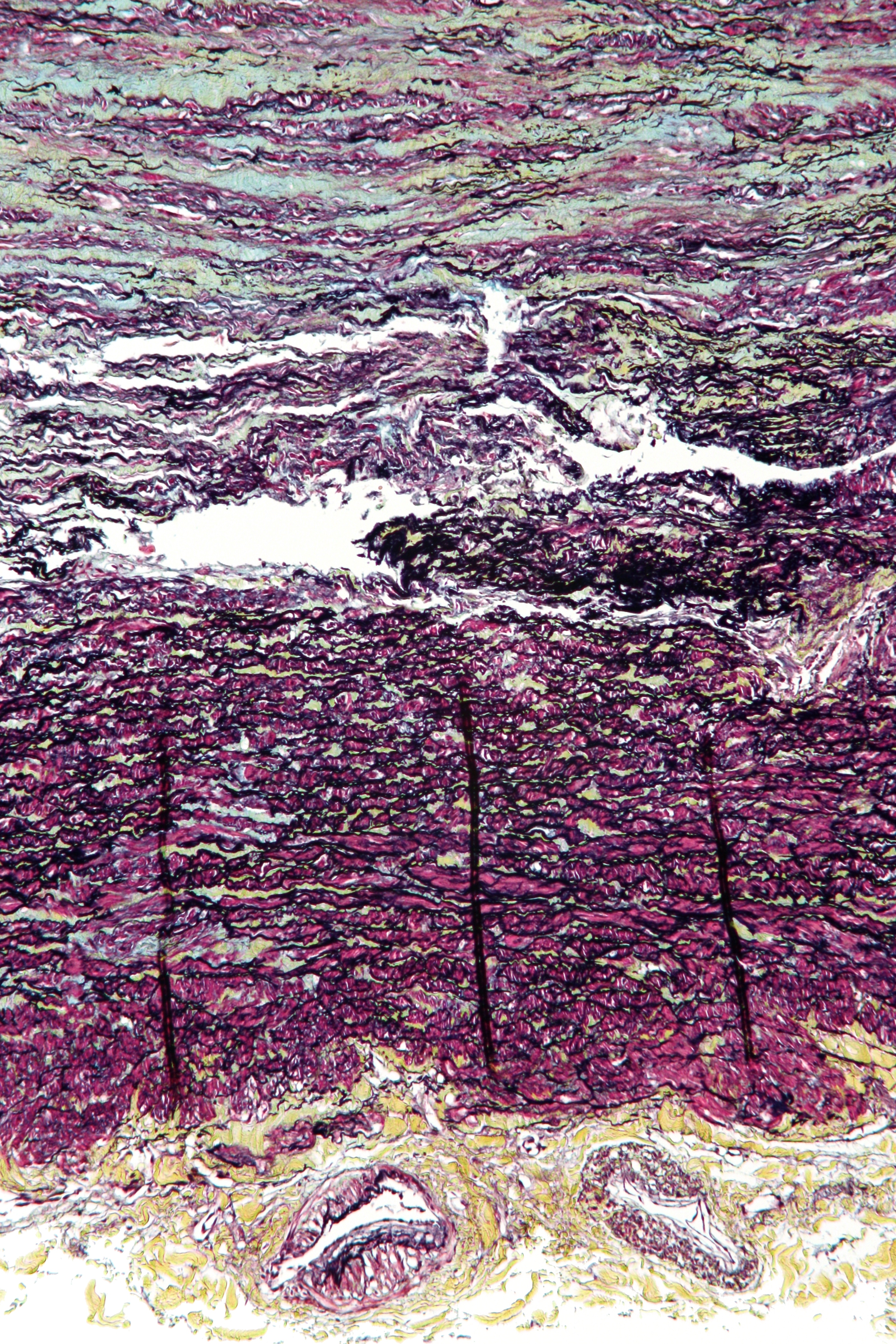
- Micrograph showing cystic medial degeneration. The tunica adventitia (also called tunica externia; yellow at bottom of image) with vaso vasorum is also seen. Movat's stain.

Details
- Part of: Wall of large blood vessels
- System: Circulatory system

Identifiers
- Latin: vasa vasorum
- MeSH: D014651
- TA98: A12.0.00.028
- TH: H3.09.02.0.06001
- FMA: 77433

Vasa vasorum are networks of small blood vessels that supply the walls of large blood vessels, such as elastic arteries (e.g., the aorta) and large veins (e.g., the venae cavae).

The name derives from Latin 'the vessels of the vessels'. Occasionally, two different singular forms are seen: vasa vasis (from Latin 'the vessels of a vessel') and vas vasis (from Latin 'a vessel of a vessel').

== Structure ==
Studies conducted with 3D micro-CT on pig and human arteries from different vascular beds have shown that there are three different types of vasa vasorum:

- Vasa vasorum internae, that originate directly from the main lumen of the artery and then branch into the vessel wall.
- Vasa vasorum externae, that originate from branches of the main artery and then dive back into the vessel wall of the main artery.
- Venous vasa vasorae, that originate within the vessel wall of the artery but then drain into the main lumen or branches of concomitant vein.

Depending on the type of vasa vasorum, it penetrates the vessel wall starting at the intimal layer (vasa vasorum interna) or the adventitial layer (vasa vasorum externa). Due to higher radial and circumferential pressures within the vessel wall layers closer to the main lumen of the artery, vasa vasorum externa cannot perfuse these regions of the vessel wall (occlusive pressure).

The structure of the vasa vasorum varies with the size, function and location of the vessels. Cells need to be within a few cell-widths of a capillary to stay alive. In the largest vessels, the vasa vasorum penetrates the outer (tunica adventitia) layer and middle (tunica media) layer almost to the inner (tunica intima) layer. In smaller vessels it penetrates only the outer layer. In the smallest vessels, the vessels' own circulation nourishes the walls directly and they have no vasa vasorum at all.

Vasa vasorum are more frequent in veins than arteries. Some authorities hypothesize that the vasa vasorum would be more abundant in large veins, as partial oxygen pressure and osmotic pressure is lower in veins. This would lead to more vasa vasorum needed to supply the vessels sufficiently. The converse argument is that generally artery walls are thicker and more muscular than veins as the blood passing through is of a higher pressure. This means that it would take longer for any oxygen to diffuse through to the cells in the tunica adventitia and the tunica media, causing them to need a more extensive vasa vasorum.

A later method of scanning is optical coherence tomography that also gives 3D imaging.

== Function ==
The vasa vasorum are found in large veins and arteries such as the aorta and its branches. These small vessels serve to provide blood supply and nourishment for tunica adventitia and outer parts of tunica media of large vessels.

== Clinical significance ==
- In the human descending aorta, vasa vasorum cease to supply the arterial tunica media with oxygenated blood at the level of the renal arteries. Thus, below this point, the aorta is dependent on diffusion for its metabolic needs, and is necessarily markedly thinner. This leads to an increased likelihood of aortic aneurysm at this location, especially in the presence of atherosclerotic plaques. Other species, such as dogs, do have vasa vasorum below their renal vasculature, and aneurysms at this site are substantially less likely. Cerebral blood vessels are devoid of vasa vasorum; however, these vessels have rete vasorum, which have similar function to vasa vasorum.
- A relationship exists between changes in the vasa vasorum and the development of atheromatous plaques. It is not understood whether changes in the vasa vasorum, especially in terms of their appearance and disappearance, is a cause or merely an effect of disease processes. In 2017 Haverich proposed that the formation of plaques is not from inside the vessel, but the result of inflammation of the vasa vasorum. Haverich noted that arteries fed by vasa vasorum are subject to development of arteriosclerotic plaques. He postulated that inflammation compromises the integrity of the arterial wall. He noted that arteries with thin walls, not having vasa vasorum, do not develop arteriosclerosis. Damage by inflamed vasa vasorum leads to cell death within the wall and subsequent plaques formation. Vasa vasorum inflammation can be caused by viruses, bacteria, and fine dust among others. According to his view this concept conforms to observations that cardiac infarctions are more common when influenza has occurred or fine particles have been inhaled.
- Small vessels like vasa vasorum and vasa nervorum are particularly susceptible to external mechanical compression, and thus are involved in pathogenesis of peripheral vascular and nerve diseases.
- A tear in vasa vasorum situated in tunica media layer of aorta may start pathologic cascade of events leading to aortic dissection.
- Presence of corkscrew collateral vessels in vasa vasorum is a hallmark of Buerger's disease and distinguishes it from Raynaud's phenomenon.
- T cells found near vasa vasorum are implicated in pathogenic process of giant cell arteritis.
- Inflammation and subsequent destruction of the vasa vasorum is the cause of syphilitic aortitis in tertiary syphilis. Obliterating endarteritis of the vasa vasorum results in ischemia and weakening of the aortic adventitia, which may lead to aneurysm formation in the thoracic aorta.
