= Chronic allograft nephropathy =

- Other names: Sclerosing/chronic allograft nephropathy
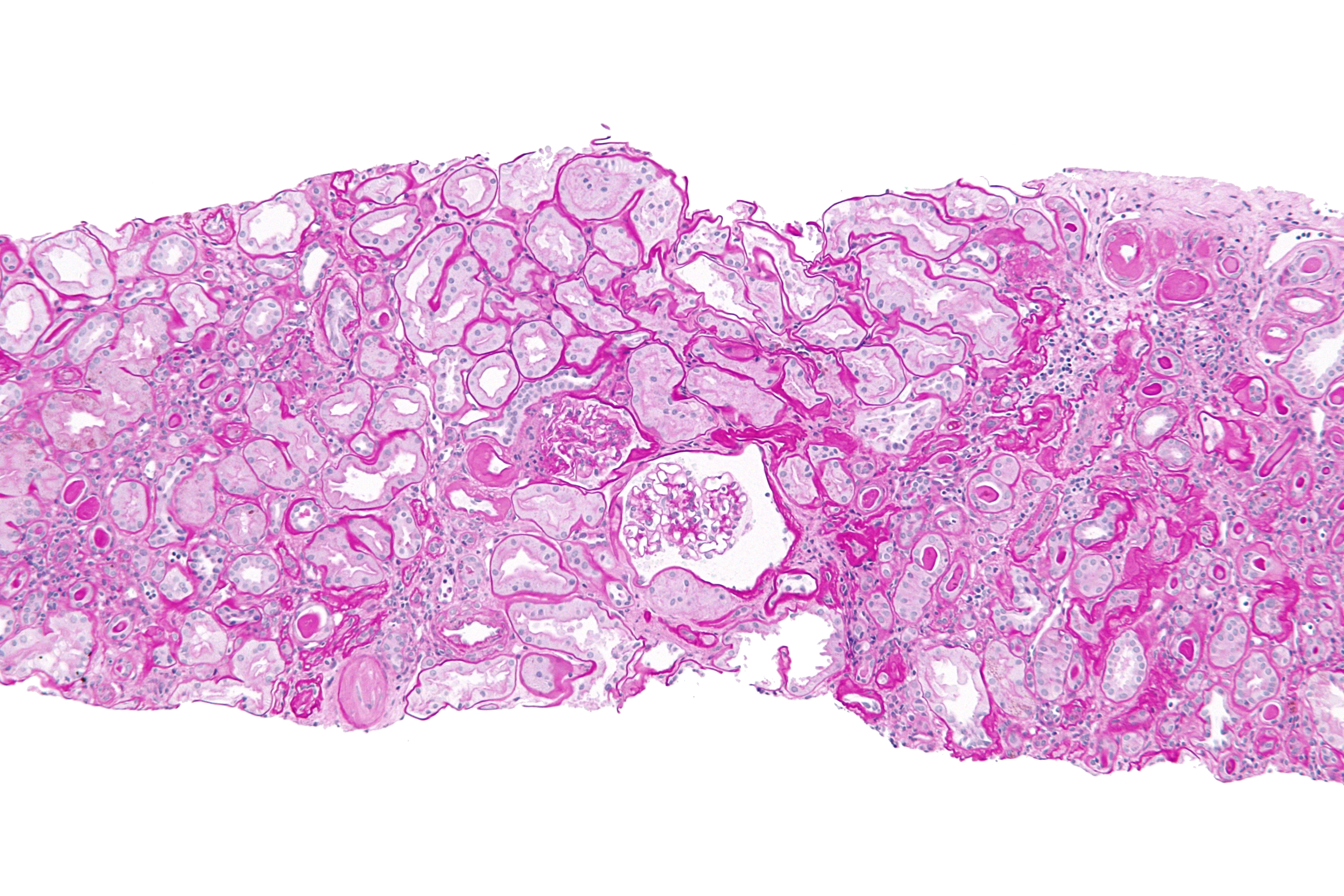
- Micrograph of chronic allograft nephropathy. PAS stain.
- Specialty: Urology

Chronic allograft nephropathy (CAN) is a kidney disorder which is the leading cause of kidney transplant failure, occurring months to years after the transplant.

== Symptoms and signs ==
CAN is characterized by a gradual decline in kidney function and, typically, accompanied by high blood pressure and hematuria.

== Pathology ==
The histopathology is characterized by interstitial fibrosis, tubular atrophy, fibrotic intimal thickening of arteries and glomerulosclerosis.

== Diagnosis ==
CAN is diagnosed by examination of tissue, e.g. a kidney biopsy.
