= Elastic artery =

Artery able to stretch in response to each pulse

Details
- System: Cardiovascular system

Identifiers
- TH: H3.09.02.0.01010

An elastic artery (conducting artery or conduit artery) is an artery with many collagen and elastin filaments in the tunica media, which gives it the ability to stretch in response to each pulse. This elasticity also gives rise to the Windkessel effect, which helps to maintain a relatively constant pressure in the arteries despite the pulsating nature of the blood flow. Elastic arteries include the largest arteries in the body, those closest to the heart. They give rise to medium-sized vessels known as distributing arteries (or muscular arteries).

The pulmonary arteries, the aorta, and its branches together comprise the body's system of elastic arteries. Other examples include the brachiocephalic artery, common carotid arteries, subclavian artery, and common iliac artery.

== Structure ==
The most prominent feature of elastic arteries is the very thick tunica media in which elastic lamellae alternate with layers of smooth muscle fibers. The adult aorta has about 50 elastic lamellae.

The tunica intima is well developed, with many smooth muscle cells in the subendothelial connective tissue, and often shows folds in cross section because of the vessel’s contraction with loss of blood pressure at death. Between the intima and the media lies the internal elastic lamina, usually better defined than the elastic laminae of the media. The relatively thin adventitia contains vasa vasorum, which also supply elastic arteries, unlike smaller blood vessels, which are supplied by diffusion.

== Physiology ==
The numerous elastic laminae of these arteries contribute to their important function of making blood flow more uniform. During ventricular contraction (systole), blood moves through the arteries forcefully, stretching the elastin and distending the wall within limits set by its content of collagen. When the ventricles relax (diastole), ventricular pressure drops to a low level, and the elastin layers rebound passively, helping to maintain arterial pressure. The aortic and pulmonary valves prevent backflow of blood into the heart, so blood continues to flow away from the heart during this rebound. Arterial blood pressure and blood velocity decrease and become less variable as the distance from the heart increases.
