= Outer coat =

Outer coat can refer to:

- Overcoat, an outerwear coat
- Guard hair, the longest, most coarse hairs in a mammal's coat
- Tunica adventitia (vessels), the outermost layer of a blood vessel
