= Muscular artery =

Arteries able to dilate to regulate peripheral blood flow

A muscular artery (or distributing artery) is a medium-sized artery that draws blood from an elastic artery and branches into "resistance vessels" including small arteries and arterioles. Their walls contain larger number of smooth muscles, allowing them to contract and expand depending on peripheral blood demand.

This contrasts to the mechanism of elastic arteries, which use their elastic properties to store the energy generated by the heart's contraction for a brief moment (elastic recoil).

Examples of muscular arteries include the radial artery, femoral artery and the splenic artery.

Muscular arteries, along with elastic arteries, are common sites for atherosclerosis.

== Structure ==
The tunica intima of muscular arteries features a thin subendothelial layer and a prominent internal elastic lamina, while the media may contain up to 40 layers of large smooth muscle cells interspersed with a variable number of elastic lamellae, depending on the vessel size. Only the larger muscular arteries possess an external elastic lamina. The adventitia, the outermost layer, contains lymphatic capillaries, vasa vasorum, and nerves, which may extend into the outer parts of the media.

Under the microscope, muscular arteries can be identified by their clearly defined internal elastic lamina. In constricted vessels, the elastic lamina of muscular arteries appears thick and kinky. The elastic lamina is best visualized using Verhoeff's stain, but can be easily detected in specimens stained using other techniques as a well-defined negative staining region.
