= Axel Haverich =

German cardiac surgeon

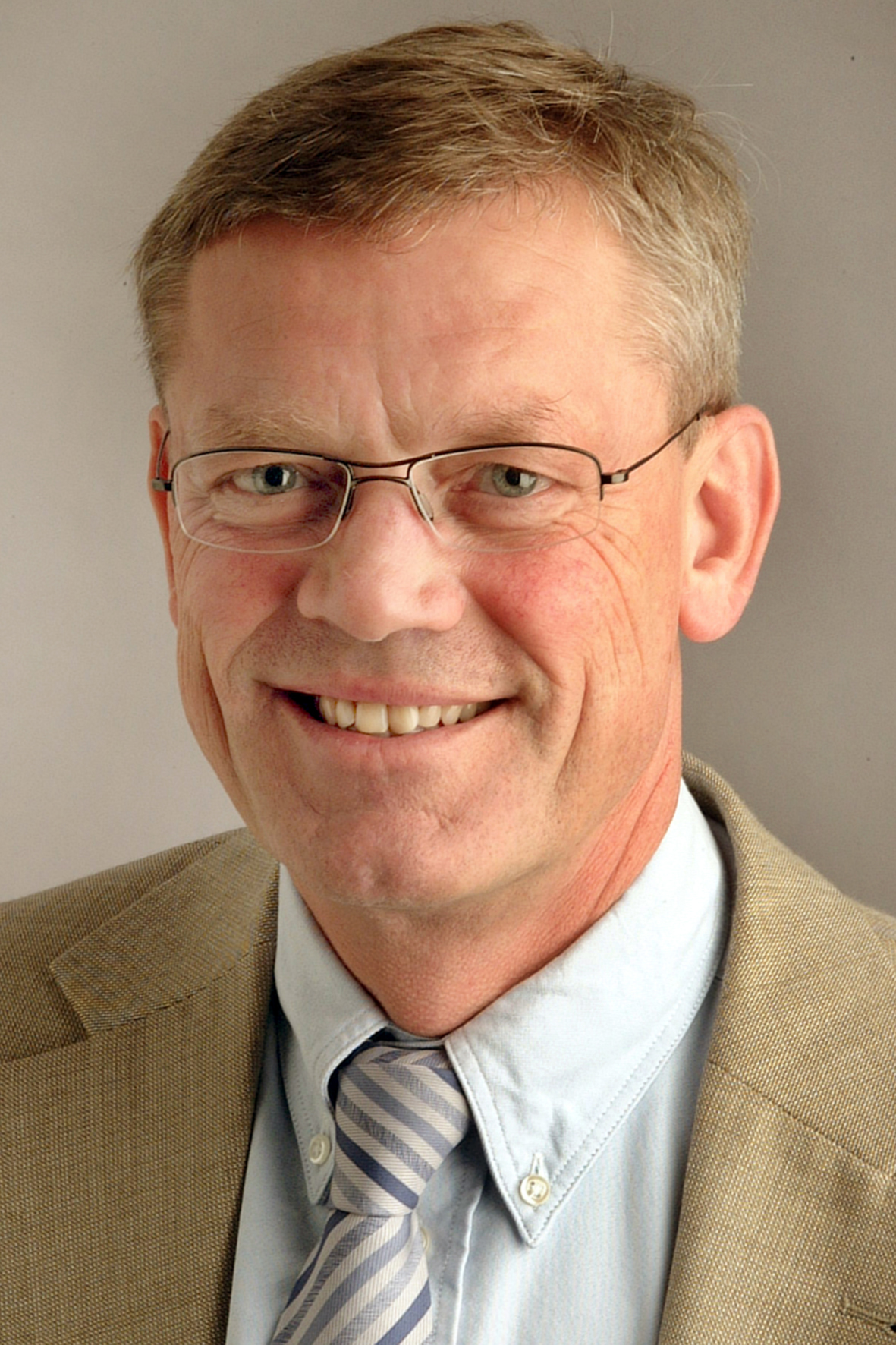
Axel Haverich (2007)

Axel Haverich (born March 9, 1953) is a German cardiac surgeon.

== Biography ==
Born in Lemgo, Haverich completed his Abitur at the Barntrup Gymnasium in 1972. He studied medicine at the Medizinische Hochschule Hannover (MHH) and graduated in 1978. One year later he received his M.D. title (promotion). During his work as an assistant surgeon he spend time as a research assistant at the Department of Cardiovascular Surgery of the Stanford University. In 1985 he became Senior Surgeon (Oberarzt) at the Clinic for Cardiac, Thoracic, and Vascular Surgery at the MHH. His habilitation was completed in 1987. From 1993 to 1996 he worked as the Director for heart and vascular surgery at the Kiel University. In 1996 he returned to the MHH as medical director of Cardiac, Thoracic, Transplant and Vascular Surgery.

== Work ==
Much of Haverich’s work is focused on tissue engineering and development of implantable organs, specifically for the heart and vascular system. In 2006 his team reported on the transplantation of heart valves in two children (11 and 13 years old) done in 2002; the heart valves originated from donors, were decellularized, and then reseeded with autologous stem cells so that they would continue to grow. Haverich's aim is eventually to rebuild the heart by tissue engineering "from ourselves".

In 1996 Haverich founded the Leibniz Research Laboratories for Biotechnology and Artificial Organs (LEBAO) to develop bioengineered tissue for the heart. In 2006 Haverich founded a private company, Corlife, to produce decellularized heart halves.

=== Hypothesis on development of arteriosclerosis ===
In 2017 Haverich presented a new hypothesis about the pathogenesis of arteriosclerosis. While the potential role of infection and inflammation had been discussed for decades, Haverich noted that only specific arteries were subject to development of arteriosclerotic plaques. He postulated that the formation of plaques is not from inside the vessel, but the result of inflammation of the feeding vessels (vasa vasorum) of arteries that becoming inflamed compromising the integrity of the arterial wall. He noted that arteries with thin walls not having vasa vasorum do not develop arteriosclerosis. He postulated that the damage by inflamed vasa vasorum leads to cell death within the wall and subsequent plaques formation. Vasa vasorum inflammation can be caused by viruses, bacteria, and fine dust among others. According to his view this concept conforms to observations that cardiac infarctions are more common when influenza has occurred or fine particles have been inhaled.

== Memberships and editorships ==
(selection)

- Senate of MHH, 1999–2003
- Senate of Deutsche Forschungsgemeinschaft, 2001–2007
- Leopoldina, since 2003
- President of the German Society of Surgery, 2010–2011
- Co-Editor:
  - European Journal of Cardio-Thoracic Surgery, since 1993
  - Transplantationsmedizin, 1988–1992
  - Langenbeck’s Archives of Surgery, since 1997

== Awards ==
- 1993 Franz Köhler-Preis for experimental and clinical organ preservation in lung transplants
- 1995 Gottfried Wilhelm Leibniz Prize
- 2002 Niedersächsischer Staatspreis
- 2007 Honorary degree by the Nicolae Testemițanu State University of Medicine and Pharmacy of Chișinău, Moldavia
- 2014 Münster Heart Centre Lecture Award, Stiftung Herzzentrum Münster
