= NT5E =

Enzyme converting AMP to adenosine

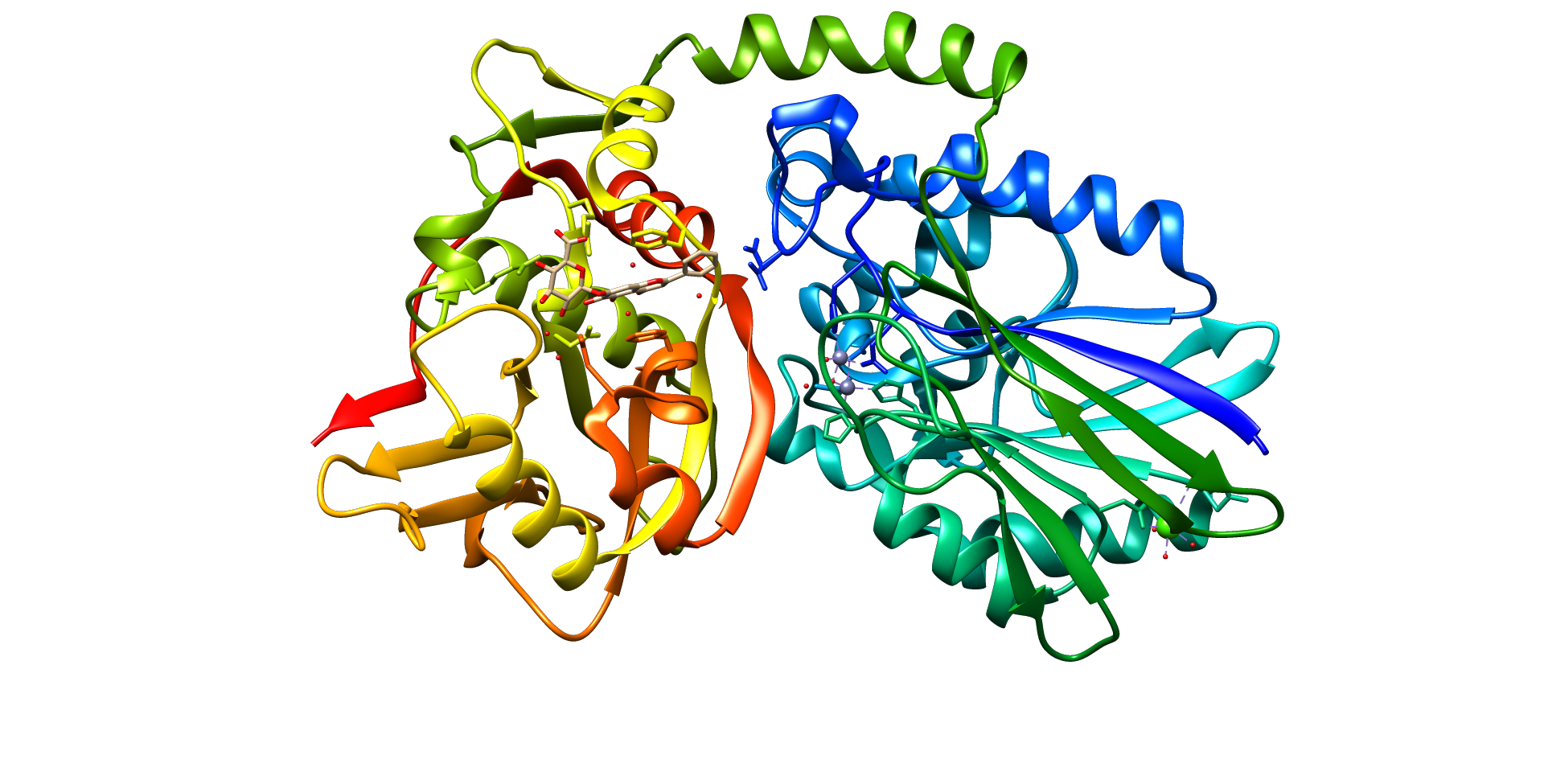

Identifiers
- Aliases: NT5E, CALJA, CD73, E5NT, NT, NT5, NTE, eN, eNT, 5'-nucleotidase ecto
- External IDs: OMIM: 129190; MGI: 99782; GeneCards: NT5E
Available structures
| PDB | Ortholog search: PDBe RCSB |
| PDB | List of PDB id codes 4H2B, 4H1Y, 4H2F, 4H2I, 4H1S, 4H2G |
Enzyme activity
| EC # | BRENDA | ExPASy | KEGG | MetaCyc |
|---|---|---|---|---|
| 3.1.3.5 | ↗ | ↗ | ↗ | ↗ |
| 3.1.3.35 | ↗ | ↗ | ↗ | ↗ |
| 3.1.3.89 | ↗ | ↗ | ↗ | ↗ |
| 3.1.3.91 | ↗ | ↗ | ↗ | ↗ |
| 3.1.3.99 | ↗ | ↗ | ↗ | ↗ |

Gene location (Human)
| Chr. | Chromosome 6 (human) |
| Band | 6q14.3 | Start | 85,449,584 bp |
| Band | 6q14.3 | End | 85,495,791 bp |

Gene location (Mouse)
| Chr. | Chromosome 9 (mouse) |
| Band | 9|9 E3.1 | Start | 88,209,250 bp |
| Band | 9|9 E3.1 | End | 88,254,145 bp |
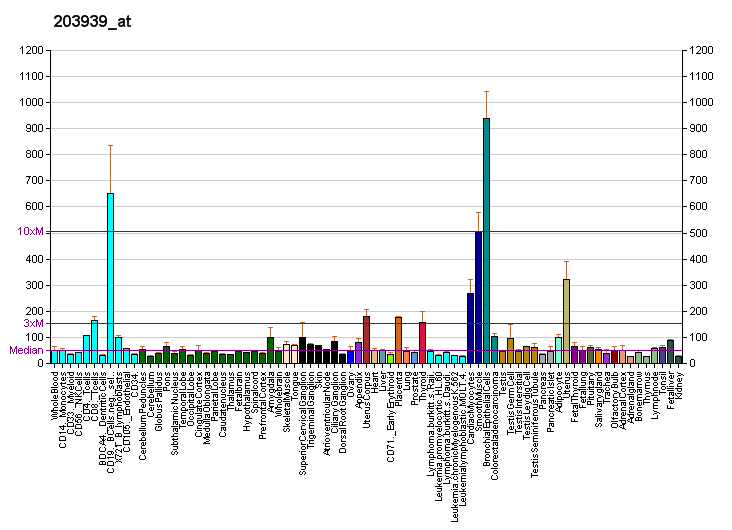
RNA expression pattern
| Bgee | Human / Mouse (ortholog); Top expressed in: stromal cell of endometrium; Achilles tendon; jejunal mucosa; synovial joint; cartilage tissue; smooth muscle tissue; canal of the cervix; tendon of biceps brachii; germinal epithelium; tibia / Top expressed in: epithelium of stomach; lumbar spinal ganglion; left colon; right kidney; seminal vesicula; granulocyte; neural layer of retina; retinal pigment epithelium; proximal tubule; skin of external ear; More reference expression data |
| BioGPS | More reference expression data |
Gene ontology
| Molecular function | metal ion binding; nucleotide binding; hydrolase activity, acting on ester bonds; hydrolase activity; 5'-nucleotidase activity |
| Cellular component | anchored component of membrane; extracellular exosome; membrane; plasma membrane; cytosol; cell surface; nucleoplasm |
| Biological process | pyrimidine nucleoside catabolic process; negative regulation of inflammatory response; purine nucleotide catabolic process; AMP catabolic process; adenosine biosynthetic process; dephosphorylation; DNA metabolic process; leukocyte cell-cell adhesion; nucleotide catabolic process; NAD metabolic process |
Sources:Amigo / QuickGO
Orthologs
| Databases | NCBI: entry; OMA: entry |
| Species | Human | Mouse |
| Entrez | 4907 | 23959 |
| Ensembl | ENSG00000135318 | ENSMUSG00000032420 |
| UniProt | P21589 | Q61503 |
| RefSeq (mRNA) | NM_002526; NM_001204813 | NM_011851 |
| RefSeq (protein) | NP_001191742; NP_002517 | NP_035981 |
| Location (UCSC) | Chr 6: 85.45 – 85.5 Mb | Chr 9: 88.21 – 88.25 Mb |
| PubMed search |
- Wikidata
| View/Edit Human | View/Edit Mouse |

5′-nucleotidase (5′-NT), also known as ecto-5′-nucleotidase or CD73 (cluster of differentiation 73), is an enzyme that in humans is encoded by the NT5E gene. CD73 commonly serves to convert AMP to adenosine.

== Function ==
Ecto-5-prime-nucleotidase (5-prime-ribonucleotide phosphohydrolase; EC 3.1.3.5) catalyzes the conversion at neutral pH of purine 5-prime mononucleotides to nucleosides, the preferred substrate being AMP. The enzyme consists of a dimer of 2 identical 70-kD subunits bound by a glycosyl phosphatidyl inositol linkage to the external face of the plasma membrane. The enzyme is used as a marker of lymphocyte differentiation. Consequently, a deficiency of NT5 occurs in a variety of immunodeficiency diseases (e.g. see MIM 102700, MIM 300300). Other forms of 5-prime nucleotidase exist in the cytoplasm and lysosomes and can be distinguished from ecto-NT5 by their substrate affinities, requirement for divalent magnesium ion, activation by ATP, and inhibition by inorganic phosphate.

=== Immunosuppression ===
NT5E (CD73) is a surface enzyme which is expressed on multiple cells. This enzyme mediates the gradual hydrolysis of the autocrine and paracrine danger signals of ATP and ADP to anti-inflammatory adenosine. Immune suppression mediated by adenosinergic pathways is very important for maintaining immune system homeostasis. Immune suppressive functions of T regulatory cells (Tregs) are also dependent on CD73 expression. Tregs generally suppress the immune response. They affect proliferation and function of T cell. CD73 also occurs on anergic CD4 + T cells, thereby maintaining self tolerance to healthy tissues as well as protecting the fetus from the mother's immune system during pregnancy. Also described was adenosine generated by NT5E, which limits the inflammatory immune response by negative feedback in neutrophil which express the adenosine receptor.

=== Transcription factor binding sites ===
The NT5E promoter contains binding sites for transcription factors AP-2, SMAD proteins, SP-1 and elements responsive to cAMP, which can be found in c-AMP promoter parts. SMADs 2, 3, 4 and 5 and SP-1 can bind to the NT5E promoter in rats, as was proven in chromatin immunoprecipitation assays. Because human and rat NT5E transcripts are 89% identical, human NT5E could be also regulated by SMAD proteins.

== Clinical significance ==
=== Calcification of joints and arteries ===
Rare allelic variants are associated with a syndrome of adult-onset calcification of joints and arteries (CALJA) affecting the iliac, femoral, and tibial arteries reducing circulation in the legs and the joints of the hands and feet causing pain.

=== Systemic lupus erythematosus ===
Specialized immune cells such as myeloid-derived suppressor cells and regulatory T cells also mediate their effects via adenosine generated by local ectonucleotidase. In some cases of systemic lupus erythematosus, adequate T cell expression of CD73 is missing, which shows an impaired regulatory function of T cells.

=== Cancer ===
NT5E can act as an immune inhibitory control molecule. Free adenosine generated by NT5E inhibits cellular immune responses and thereby promotes immune escape of tumor cells. Due to enzymatic and non-enzymatic properties, CD73 is involved in cancer-related processes and is upregulated in many cancers such as leukemia, glioblastoma, melanoma, esophageal, prostate, ovarian and breast cancer. It is an important key molecule in cancer regulation and development and is involved in tumor progression. In addition, NT5E functions as an adhesion and signaling molecule and can regulate cellular signaling with extracellular matrix components such as fibronectin and laminin. This can mediate the metastatic and invasive properties of cancer. In mouse breast and prostate cancer tumor models as well as in breast cancer patient derived xenograft models, NT5E was confirmed to support tumor angiogenesis. His expression promotes invasion and metastasis of murine and human melanoma cells and human breast cancer cells. Tumor infiltration by cells which express NT5E such as myeloid derived suppressor cells (MDSC), Treg's, dendritic cells (DC) leads to accumulation of adenosine. Subsequently, cAMP signaling is triggered in T cell that express the adenosine A2A receptor. Adenosine receptor are also expressed on macrophage, DCs, MDSC and natural killer cell(NK). Thus, adenosine may inhibit the function of these immune cells. In addition, the tumor cells may also express adenosine A1 and A3 receptors associated with Gαi proteins, promoting both the migration and proliferation of tumor cells. Especially due to its beneficial effects in mouse tumor models, anti-CD3 monoclonal antibody therapy is now a promising approach to cancer treatment in the future. Enzyme inhibitors of CD73 are currently being tested in clinical trials for the cancer treatment.

=== Anti-tumor immune response ===
MicroRNAs are small non-coding RNA molecules which regulate gene expression at posttranscriptional level via binding to mRNA. This leads to degradation of the target mRNA molecule or translational repression. In tumor cells the miRNA expression pattern often change and therefore affect the surface NT5E, which as result interfere the anti-tumor immune response. For example, studies confirm the role of the miR30 family in NT5E regulation. Upon miR-30a-5p expression, NT5E expression was decreased.

=== As a drug target ===
Some tumors have upregulation and overexpression of CD73, so it has been proposed as a drug target for cancer therapy

An anti-CD73 antibody CPI-006 has started early stage clinical trials as a treatment for advanced cancers.

== See also ==
- Cluster of differentiation
- Arterial calcification due to CD73 deficiency
