= Jakob Erdheim =

Austrian pathologist

Jakob Erdheim (24 May 1874, Boryslav, Galicia – 18 April 1937, Vienna) was an Austrian pathologist. He is credited with the characterization (or partial characterization) of Erdheim–Chester disease and cystic medial necrosis.

He was born into a Jewish family in Boryslav. In 1901, he received his medical doctorate from the University of Vienna, later working as an assistant at the institute of pathological anatomy in Vienna. In 1913, he became habilitated for pathological anatomy, and in 1916 was named director of the pathological-anatomical institute at Vienna city hospital. From 1924 onward, he was associated with the "Krankenhaus der Stadt Wien-Lainz".

He distinguished himself in research of hyperparathyroidism, acromegaly, Paget’s disease and pituitary gland abnormalities. His name is associated with "Erdheim's syndrome", a condition that is also known as "Scaglietti-Dagnini syndrome" (cervical spondylosis secondary to acromegaly). Other eponyms associated with him are:

- Erdheim disease: a synonym for cystic medial necrosis.
- Erdheim tumor: a synonym for craniopharyngioma.

He used the term "nanosomia pituitaria" to describe pituitary dwarfism.

== Published works ==
- Uber Hypophysenganggeschwülste und Hirncholesteatome, 1904 - On pituitary swelling and brain cholesteatoma.
- Rachitis und Epithelkörperchen, 1914 - Rachitis and the parathyroid glands.
- Die lebensvorgange im normalen knorpel und seine wucherung bei akromegalie, 1931 - Life processes of normal cartilage and its growth in acromegalia.
