= Internal elastic lamina =

Layer of elastic tissue in blood vessels

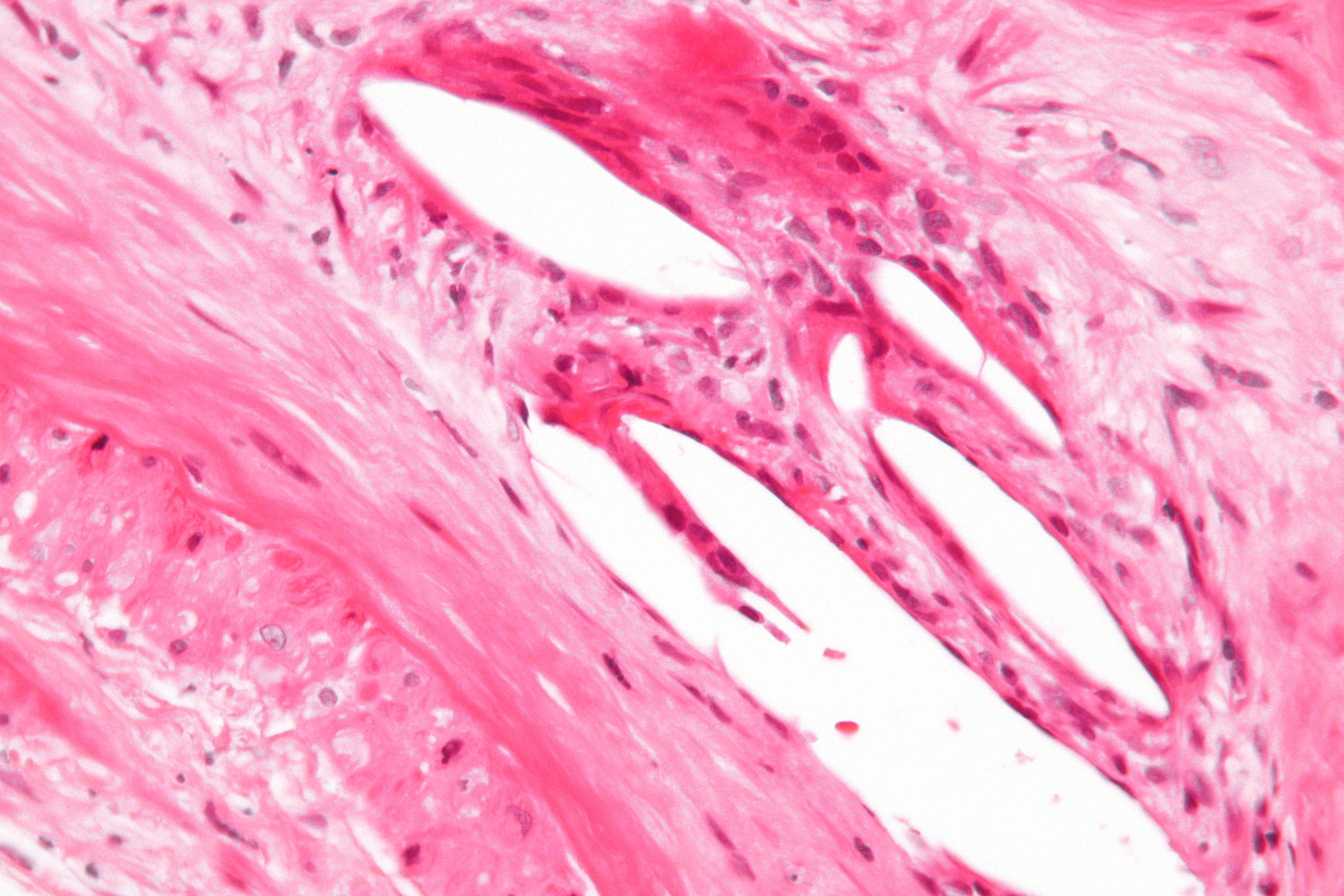
Micrograph showing the internal elastic lamina (thin pink wavy line - image edge mid-left to image edge bottom-centre-left). H&E stain.

The internal elastic lamina, internal elastic lamella or elastic interna is a layer of elastic tissue that forms the outermost part of the tunica intima of blood vessels. It separates the tunica intima from the tunica media.

== Histology ==
It is readily visualized with light microscopy in sections of muscular arteries, where it is thick and prominent, and arterioles, where it is slightly less prominent and often incomplete. It is very thin in veins and venules. In elastic arteries such as the aorta, which have very regular elastic laminae between layers of smooth muscle cells in their tunica media, the internal elastic lamina is approximately the same thickness as the other elastic laminae that are normally present.

There is small amount of subendothelial connective tissue between basement membrane of endothelial cells and internal elastic lamina.

Reduplication of internal elastic lamina can be seen in elderly individuals due to intimal fibroplasia, which is part of the aging process.

== Associated pathologic conditions ==
- Damage in giant cell arteritis leads to microaneurysms. Demonstration of fragmentation in this layer by elastin-van Gieson stain aids in diagnosis of giant cell arteritis. It stains muscle tissue in yellow, connective tissue in red and elastic structures (like internal elastic lamina) in black color.
- In chronic allograft nephropathy, disruption or reduplication of internal elastic lamina can be observed, which causes narrowing of the lumen and downstream ischemia.
- In fungal rhinosinusitis, the organism has predilection for internal elastic lamina during phase of spread.
