= Arterial calcification due to CD73 deficiency =

- Other names: Calcification of joints and arteries
- This condition is inherited via autosomal recessive manner
- Causes: mutations in the NT5E gene

Arterial calcification due to CD73 deficiency or Calcification of joints and arteries is a rare genetic disorder affecting adults.

== Signs and symptoms ==
Symptoms of this usually show up when a person is in the teens or 20s. The condition blocks blood flow by building up solid calcium in the leg arteries, but it uniquely leaves the heart arteries completely healthy. This condition is characterised by calcification of the peripheral arteries.

== Causes ==
This condition is caused by mutations in the 5'-Nucleotidase Ecto (NT5E) gene.

== Diagnosis ==
Medical evaluation and genetic tests are used to ascertain arterial calcification due to CD73 deficiency.

== Epidemiology ==
This is a rare disorder; up to 2020, fewer than 20 individuals have been reported to have the condition.

== History ==
This condition was first described in 2011.
