= Tunica media =

Middle layer of blood vessel

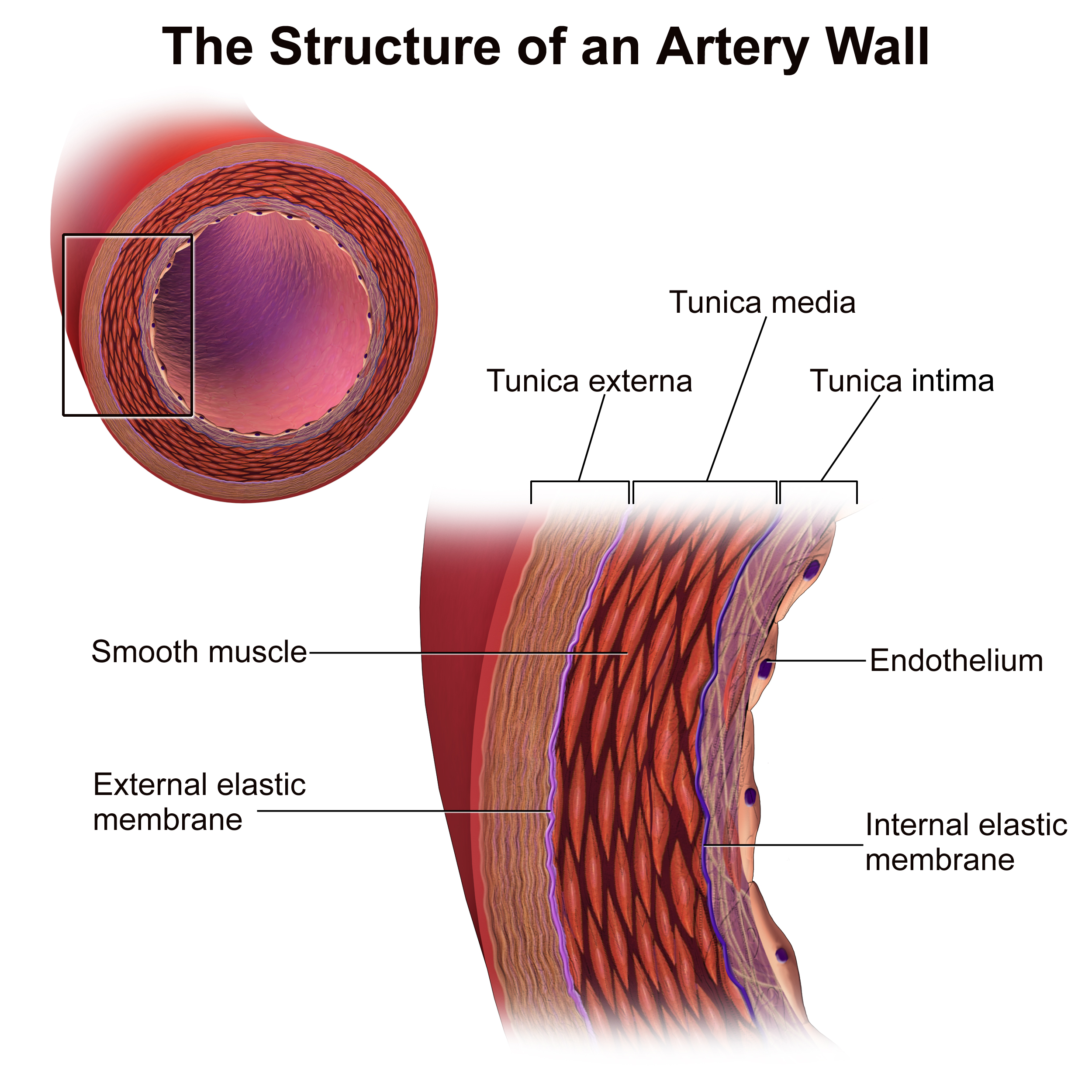

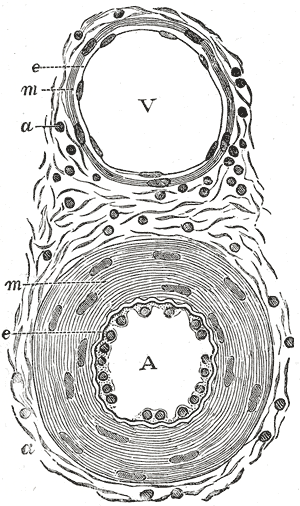
- Transverse section through a small artery and vein of the mucous membrane of the epiglottis of a child. (Tunica media is at 'm'.)

Details
- Part of: Middle layer of wall of blood vessels

Identifiers
- Latin: tunica media vasorum
- MeSH: D017540
- TA98: A12.0.00.019
- TA2: 3921
- TH: H3.09.02.0.01007
- FMA: 55590

The tunica media (Neo-Latin "middle coat"), or media for short, is the middle tunica (layer) of an artery or vein. It lies between the internal elastic lamina of the tunica intima on the inside and the tunica externa on the outside.

== Artery ==
The tunica media is made up of smooth muscle cells, elastic tissue, and collagen. It lies between the tunica intima on the inside and the tunica externa on the outside.

The middle coat (tunica media) is distinguished from the inner (tunica intima) by its color and by the transverse arrangement of its fibers.

- In the smaller arteries, it consists principally of smooth muscle fibers in fine bundles, arranged in lamellae and disposed circularly around the vessel. These lamellae vary in number according to the size of the vessel; the smallest arteries having only a single layer, and those slightly larger three or four layers - up to a maximum of six layers. It is to this coat that the thickness of the wall of the artery is mainly due.
- In the larger arteries, as the iliac, femoral, and carotid, elastic fibers and collagen unite to form lamellae which alternate with the layers of smooth muscular fibers; these lamellae are united to one another by elastic fibers which pass between the smooth muscular bundles, and are connected with the fenestrated membrane of the inner coat.
- In the largest arteries, as the aorta and brachiocephalic, the amount of elastic tissue is considerable; in these vessels a few bundles of white connective tissue also have been found in the middle coat. The muscle fiber cells are arranged in 5 to 7 layers of circular and longitudinal smooth muscle with about 50μ in length and contain well-marked, rod-shaped nuclei, which are often slightly curved. Separating the tunica media from the outer tunica externa in larger arteries is the external elastic membrane (also called the external elastic lamina). This structure is not usually seen in smaller arteries, nor is it seen in veins.

== Vein ==
The middle coat is composed of a thick layer of connective tissue with elastic fibers, intermixed, in some veins, with a transverse layer of muscular tissue.

The white fibrous element is in considerable excess, and the elastic fibers are in much smaller proportion in the veins than in the arteries.

== Additional images ==
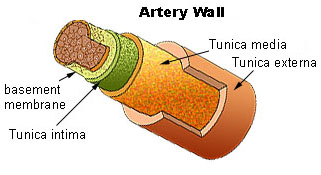
Artery wall

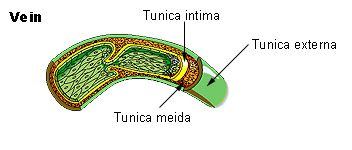
Vein

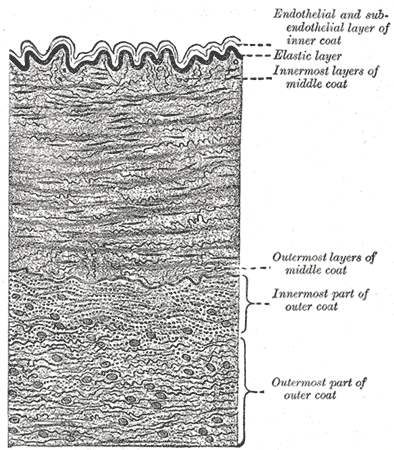
Section of a medium-sized artery

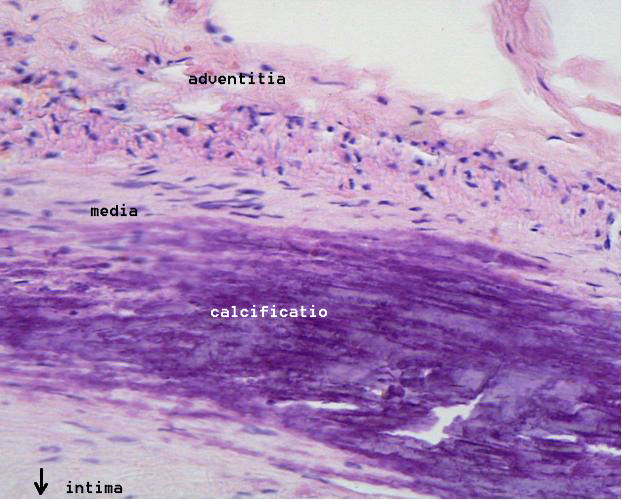
Microphotography of arterial wall with calcified (violet colour) atherosclerotic plaque (H&E stain)
