= Tunica externa =

Outer layer of blood vessel

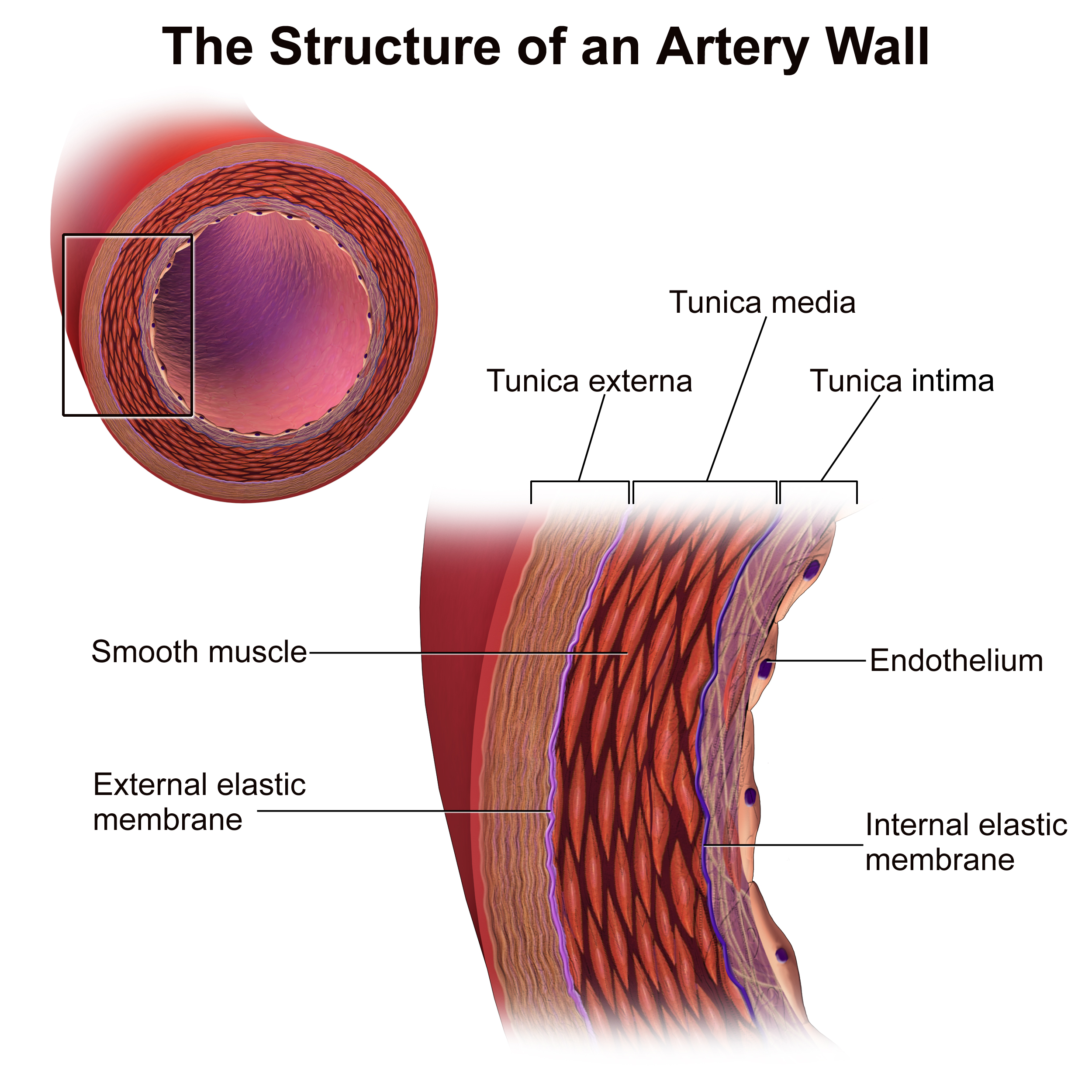

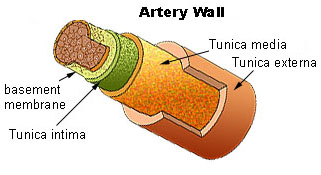
- Section of a medium-sized artery.

Details
- Part of: Wall of blood vessels

Identifiers
- Latin: tunica externa, tunica adventitia
- TA98: A12.0.00.017
- TA2: 3920
- TH: H3.09.02.0.01009

The tunica externa (Neo-Latin "outer coat"), also known as the tunica adventitia (Neo-Latin "additional coat"), is the outermost tunica (layer) of a blood vessel, surrounding the tunica media. It is mainly composed of collagen and, in arteries, is supported by external elastic lamina. The collagen serves to anchor the blood vessel to nearby organs, giving it stability.

The three layers of the blood vessels are: an inner tunica intima, a middle tunica media, and an outer tunica externa.

== Structure ==
The tunica externa is made from collagen and elastic fibers in a loose connective tissue. This is secreted by fibroblasts. This is normally the thickest tunic in veins and may be thicker than the tunica media in some larger arteries. The outer layers of the tunica externa are not distinct but rather blend with the surrounding connective tissue outside the vessel, helping to hold the vessel in relative position.

== Function ==
The tunica externa provides basic structural support to blood vessels. It prevents vessels from expanding too much from internal blood pressure, particularly arteries. It is also relevant in controlling vascular flow in the lungs.

== Clinical significance ==
A common pathological disorder concerning the tunica externa is scurvy, also known as vitamin C deficiency. Scurvy occurs because vitamin C is essential for the synthesis of collagen, and without it, the faulty collagen cannot maintain the vein walls and rupture, leading to a multitude of problems.

== Additional images ==
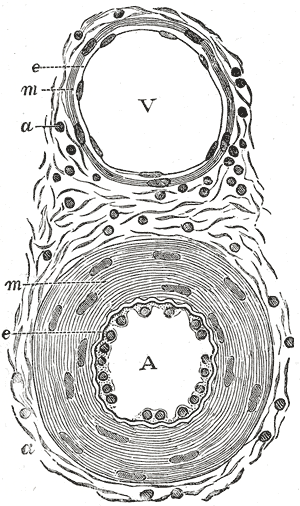
Transverse section through a small artery and vein of the mucous membrane of the epiglottis of a child. (Tunica adventitia is at 'a'.)

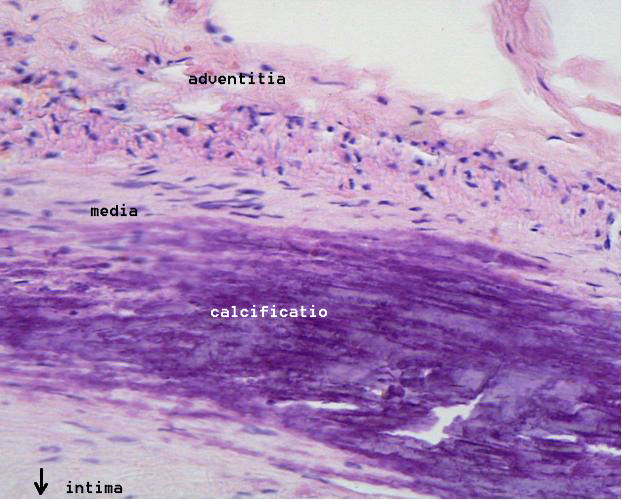
Microphotography of arterial wall with calcified (violet colour) atherosclerotic plaque (H&E stain)

== See also ==
- Adventitia
