= Tunica intima =

Inner layer of blood vessel

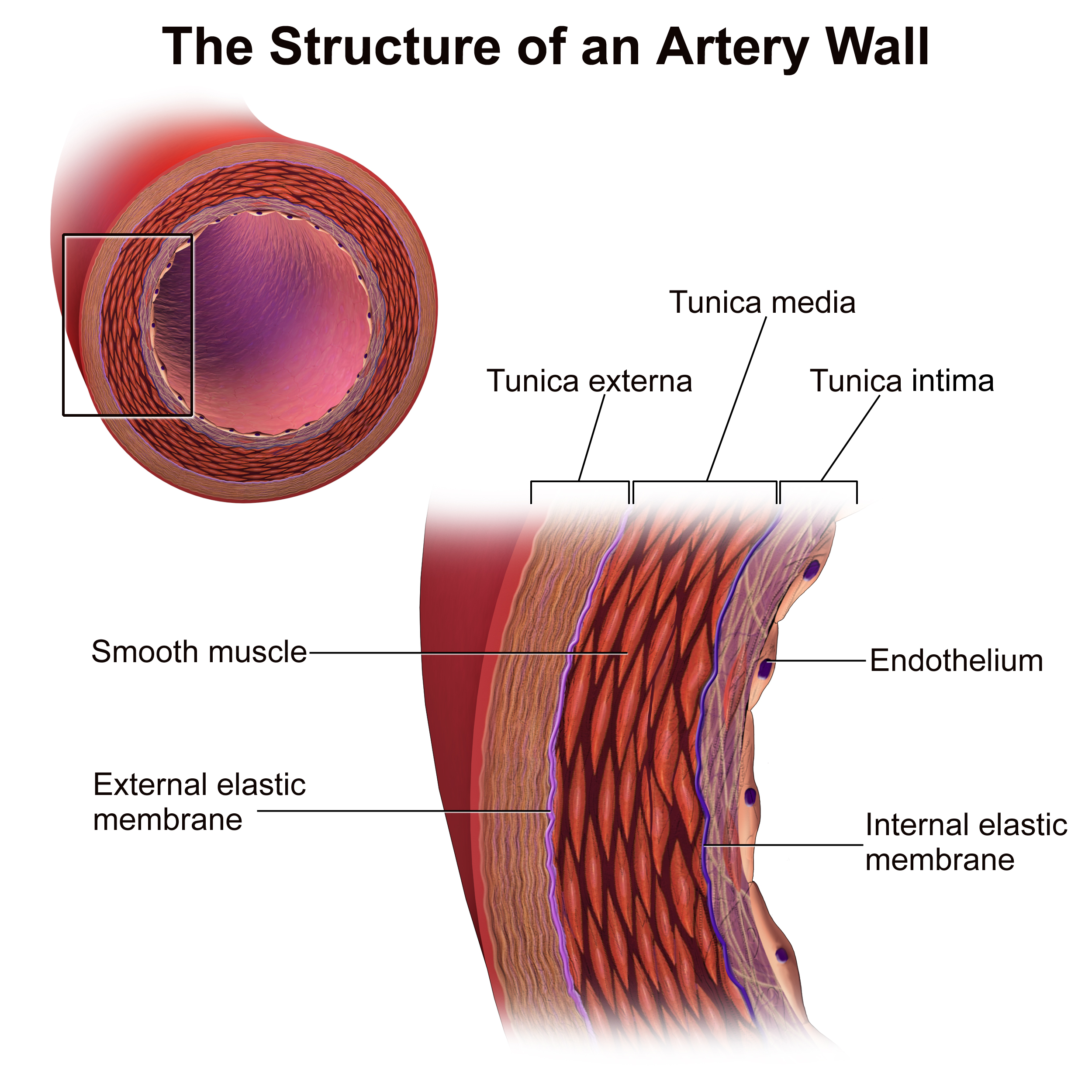

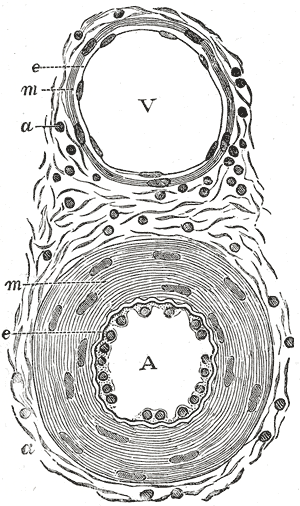
- Transverse section through a small artery and vein of the mucous membrane of the epiglottis of a child. (Tunica intima is at "e".)

Details
- Part of: Wall of blood vessels

Identifiers
- Latin: tunica intima
- MeSH: D017539
- TA98: A12.0.00.018
- TA2: 3922
- TH: H3.09.02.0.01003
- FMA: 55589

The tunica intima (Neo-Latin "inner coat"), or intima for short, is the innermost tunica (layer) of an artery or vein. It is made up of one layer of endothelial cells (and macrophages in areas of disturbed blood flow), and is supported by an internal elastic lamina. The endothelial cells are in direct contact with the blood flow.

The three layers of a blood vessel are an inner layer (the tunica intima), a middle layer (the tunica media), and an outer layer (the tunica externa).

In dissection, the inner coat (tunica intima) can be separated from the middle (tunica media) by a little maceration, or it may be stripped off in small pieces; but, because of its friability, it cannot be separated as a complete membrane. It is a fine, transparent, colorless structure which is highly elastic, and, after death, is commonly corrugated into longitudinal wrinkles.

== Structure ==
The structure of the tunica intima depends on the blood vessel type.

Elastic arteries – A single layer of endothelial and a supporting layer of elastin-rich collagen. The layer also contains fibroblasts, immune cells and smooth muscle cells.

Muscular arteries – Endothelial cells

Arterioles – A single layer of endothelial cells

Veins – Endothelial cells

The inner coat consists of:

1. A layer of pavement endothelium, the cells of which are polygonal, oval, or fusiform, and have very distinct round or oval nuclei. This endothelium is brought into view most distinctly by staining with silver nitrate.
2. A subendothelial layer, consisting of delicate connective tissue with branched cells lying in the interspaces of the tissue; in arteries of less than 2 mm in diameter the subendothelial layer consists of a single stratum of stellate cells, and the connective tissue is only largely developed in vessels of a considerable size.
3. An elastic or fenestrated layer, which consists of a membrane containing a network of elastic fibers, having principally a longitudinal direction, and in which, under the microscope, small elongated apertures or perforations may be seen, giving it a fenestrated appearance. It was therefore called by Henle the fenestrated membrane. This membrane forms the chief thickness of the inner coat, and can be separated into several layers, some of which present the appearance of a network of longitudinal elastic fibers, and others a more membranous character, marked by pale lines having a longitudinal direction. In minute arteries the fenestrated membrane is a very thin layer; but in the larger arteries, and especially in the aorta, it has a considerable thickness.

== Function ==
Endothelium had been seen to be simply the boundary between the blood in the lumen and the walls of the vessels. However, endothelium has been shown to release local chemicals called endothelins which are powerful vasoconstrictors. Endothelins help to regulate capillary exchange and alter blood flow by their constriction of the smooth muscle in the walls. Vasoconstriction increases blood pressure, and its overexpression can contribute to hypertension and cardiovascular disease.

== Additional images ==
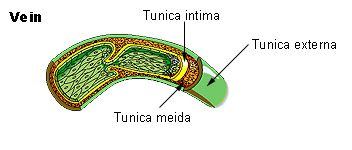
Vein

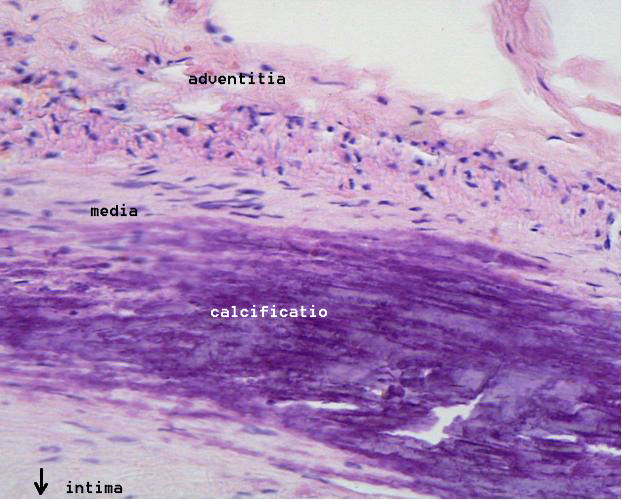
Microphotography of arterial wall with calcified (violet colour) atherosclerotic plaque (H&E stain)
