= Artery =

Blood vessels that carry blood away from the heart

- Diagram of an artery

Details
- System: Circulatory system

Identifiers
- Latin: arteria (plural: arteriae)
- Greek: ἀρτηρία
- MeSH: D001158
- TA98: A12.0.00.003
- TA2: 3896
- FMA: 50720

An artery (from Greek ἀρτηρία (artēríā)) is a blood vessel in humans and most other animals that takes oxygenated blood away from the heart in the systemic circulation to one or more parts of the body. Exceptions that carry deoxygenated blood are the pulmonary arteries in the pulmonary circulation that carry blood to the lungs for oxygenation, and the umbilical arteries in the fetal circulation that carry deoxygenated blood to the placenta. It consists of a multi-layered artery wall wrapped into a tube-shaped channel.

Arteries contrast with veins, which carry deoxygenated blood back towards the heart; or in the pulmonary and fetal circulations carry oxygenated blood to the lungs and fetus respectively.

== Structure ==
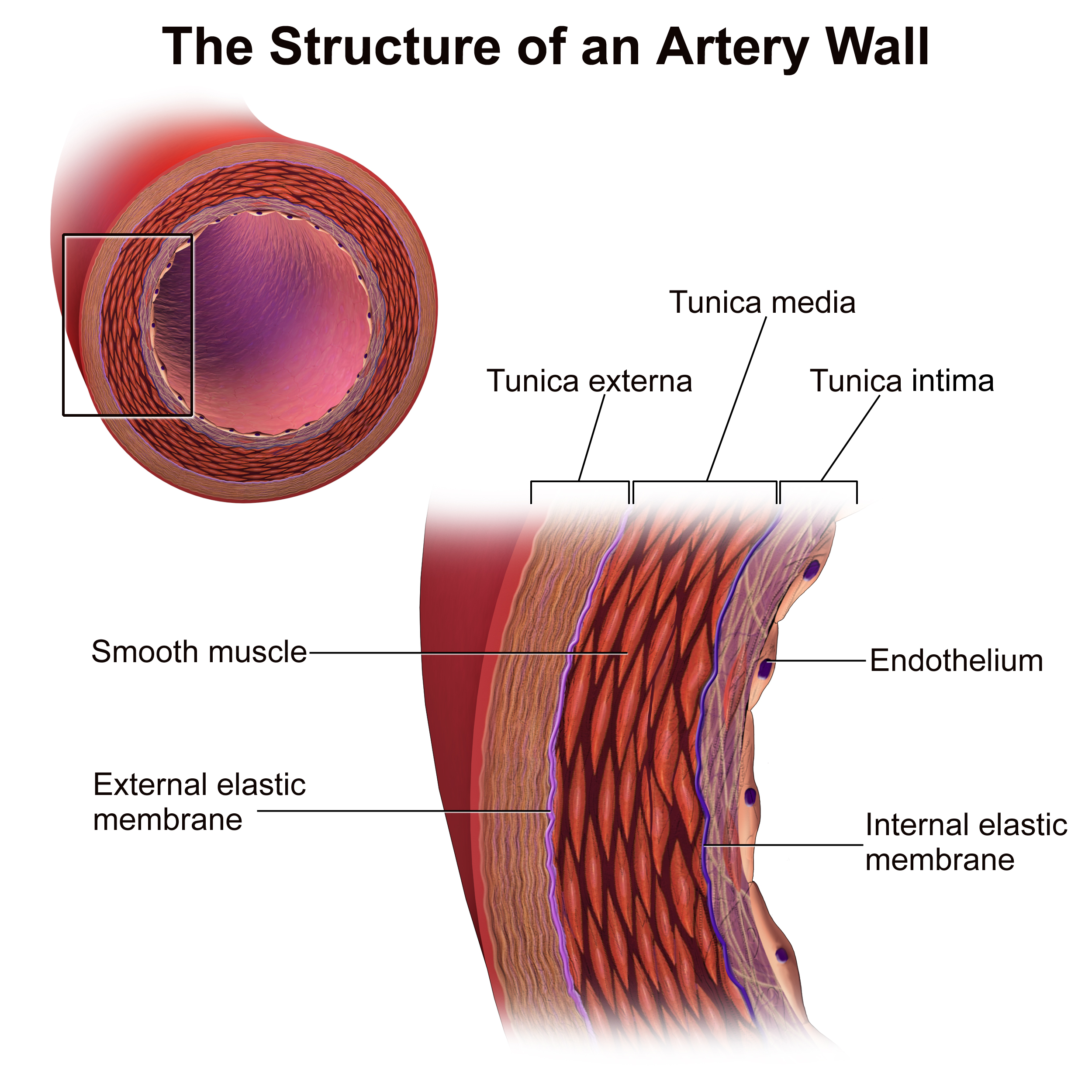
Microscopic anatomy of an artery

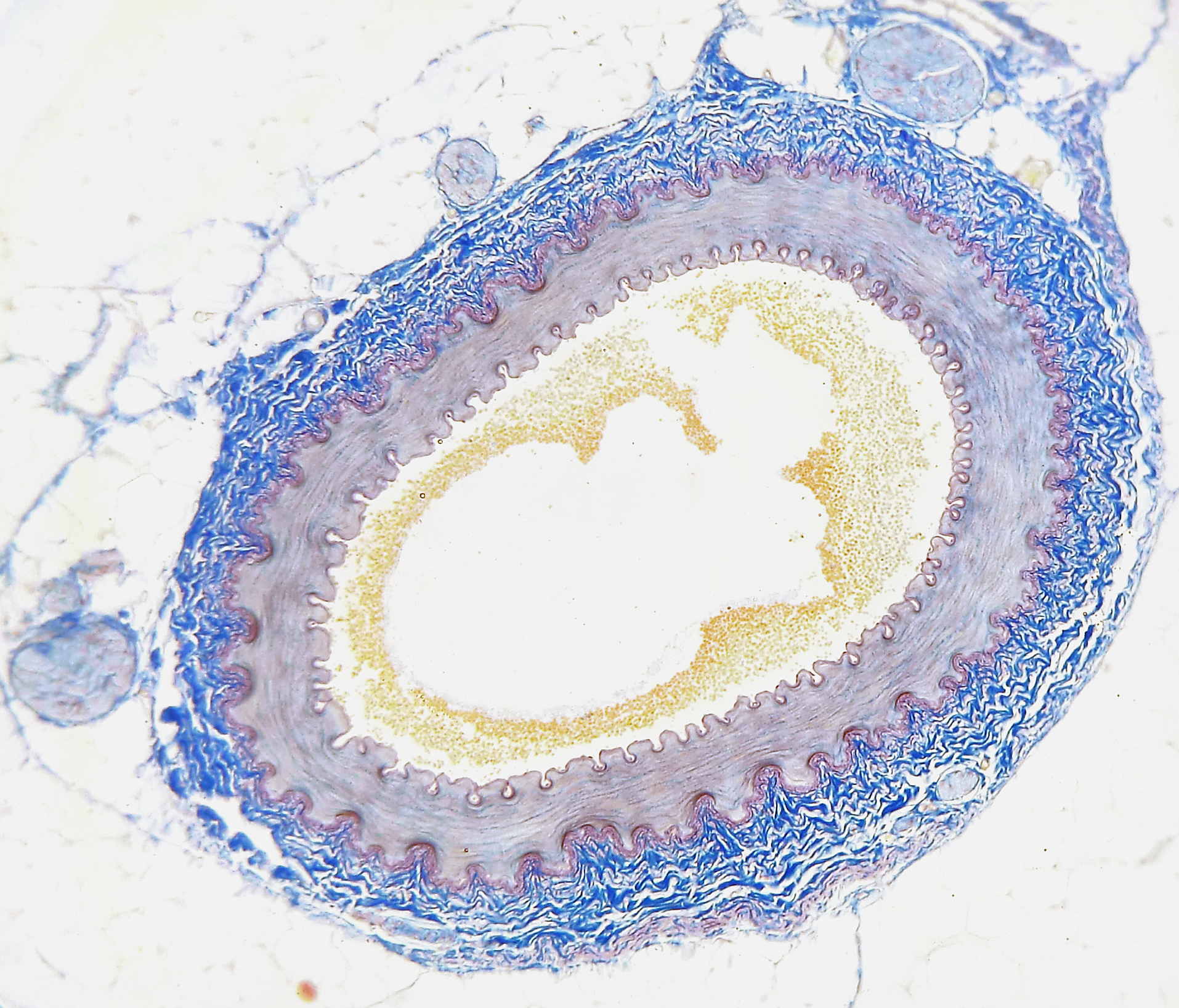
Cross-section of a human artery

The anatomy of arteries can be separated into gross anatomy, at the macroscopic level, and microanatomy, which must be studied with a microscope. The arterial system of the human body is divided into systemic arteries, carrying blood from the heart to the whole body, and pulmonary arteries, carrying deoxygenated blood from the heart to the lungs.

Large arteries (such as the aorta) are composed of many different types of cells, namely endothelial, smooth muscle, fibroblast, and immune cells. As with veins, the arterial wall consists of three layers called tunics, namely the tunica intima, tunica media, and tunica externa, from innermost to outermost. The externa, alternatively known as the tunica adventitia, is composed of collagen fibers and elastic tissue—with the largest arteries containing vasa vasorum, small blood vessels that supply the walls of large blood vessels. Most of the layers have a clear boundary between them; however, the tunica externa has a boundary that is ill-defined. Normally its boundary is considered when it meets or touches the connective tissue. Inside this layer is the tunica media, which is made up of smooth muscle cells, elastic tissue (also called connective tissue proper) and collagen fibres. The innermost layer, which is in direct contact with the flow of blood, is the tunica intima. The elastic tissue allows the artery to bend and fit through places in the body. This layer is mainly made up of endothelial cells (and a supporting layer of elastin rich collagen in elastic arteries). The hollow internal cavity in which the blood flows is called the lumen.

=== Development ===
Arterial formation begins and ends when endothelial cells begin to express arterial specific genes, such as ephrin B2.

== Function ==
Arteries form part of the human circulatory system

Arteries form part of the circulatory system. They carry blood that is oxygenated after it has been pumped from the heart. Coronary arteries also aid the heart in pumping blood by sending oxygenated blood to the heart, allowing the muscles to function. Arteries carry oxygenated blood away from the heart to the tissues, except for pulmonary arteries, which carry blood to the lungs for oxygenation (usually veins carry deoxygenated blood to the heart but the pulmonary veins carry oxygenated blood as well). There are two types of unique arteries. The pulmonary artery carries blood from the heart to the lungs, where it receives oxygen. It is unique because the blood in it is not "oxygenated", as it has not yet passed through the lungs. The other unique artery is the umbilical artery, which carries deoxygenated blood from a fetus to its mother.

Arteries have a blood pressure higher than other parts of the circulatory system. The pressure in arteries varies during the cardiac cycle. It is highest when the heart contracts and lowest when heart relaxes. The variation in pressure produces a pulse, which can be felt in different areas of the body, such as the radial pulse. Arterioles have the greatest collective influence on both local blood flow and on overall blood pressure. They are the primary "adjustable nozzles" in the blood system, across which the greatest pressure drop occurs. The combination of heart output (cardiac output) and systemic vascular resistance, which refers to the collective resistance of all of the body's arterioles, is the principal determinant of arterial blood pressure at any given moment.

Arteries have the highest pressure and have narrow lumen diameter.

Systemic arteries are the arteries (including the peripheral arteries), of the systemic circulation, which is the part of the cardiovascular system that carries oxygenated blood away from the heart, to the body, and returns deoxygenated blood back to the heart. Systemic arteries can be subdivided into two types—muscular and elastic—according to the relative compositions of elastic and muscle tissue in their tunica media as well as their size and the makeup of the internal and external elastic lamina. The larger arteries (>10 mm diameter) are generally elastic and the smaller ones (0.1–10 mm) tend to be muscular. Systemic arteries deliver blood to the arterioles, and then to the capillaries, where nutrients and gasses are exchanged.

After traveling from the aorta, blood travels through peripheral arteries into smaller arteries called arterioles, and eventually to capillaries. Arterioles help in regulating blood pressure by the variable contraction of the smooth muscle of their walls, and deliver blood to the capillaries. This smooth muscle contraction is primarily influenced by activity of the sympathetic vasomotor nerves innervating the arterioles. Enhanced sympathetic activation prompts vasoconstriction, reducing the lumen diameter. A reduced lumen diameter consequently elevates the blood pressure within the arterioles. Conversely, decreased sympathetic activity within the vasomotor nerves causes vasodilation of the vessels thereby decreasing blood pressure.

=== Aorta ===
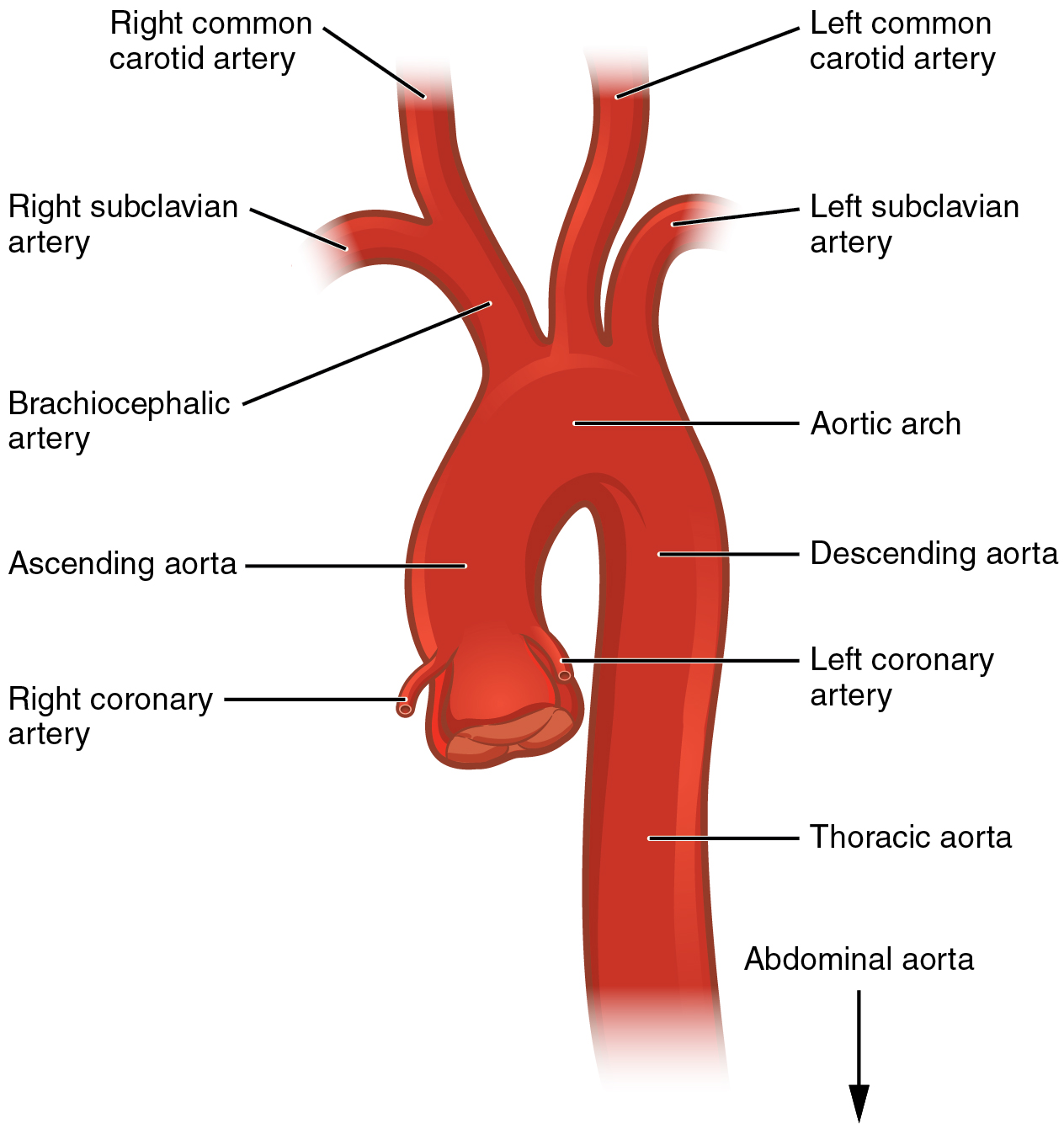
The aorta is the largest blood vessel in the human body.

The aorta is the root systemic artery (i.e., main artery). In humans, it receives blood directly from the left ventricle of the heart via the aortic valve. As the aorta branches and these arteries branch, in turn, they become successively smaller in diameter, down to the arterioles. The arterioles supply capillaries, which in turn empty into venules. The first branches off of the aorta are the coronary arteries, which supply blood to the heart muscle itself. These are followed by the branches of the aortic arch, namely the brachiocephalic artery, the left common carotid, and the left subclavian arteries.

=== Capillaries ===
The capillaries are the smallest of the blood vessels and are part of the microcirculation. The microvessels have a width of a single cell in diameter to aid in the fast and easy diffusion of gasses, sugars and nutrients to surrounding tissues. Capillaries have no smooth muscle surrounding them and have a diameter less than that of red blood cells; a red blood cell is typically 7 micrometers outside diameter, capillaries typically 5 micrometers inside diameter. The red blood cells must distort in order to pass through the capillaries.

These small diameters of the capillaries provide a relatively large surface area for the exchange of gasses and nutrients.

== Clinical significance ==
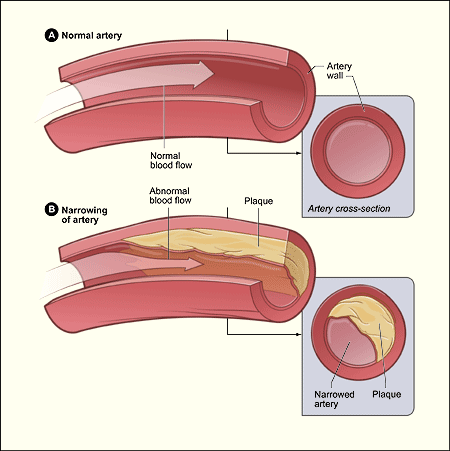
Diagram showing the effects of atherosclerosis on an artery

Systemic arterial pressures are generated by the forceful contractions of the heart's left ventricle. High blood pressure is a factor in causing arterial damage. Healthy resting arterial pressures are relatively low, mean systemic pressures typically being under 100 mmHg (1.9 psi; 13 kPa) above surrounding atmospheric pressure (about 760 mmHg, 14.7 psi, 101 kPa at sea level). To withstand and adapt to the pressures within, arteries are surrounded by varying thicknesses of smooth muscle which have extensive elastic and inelastic connective tissues. The pulse pressure, being the difference between systolic and diastolic pressure, is determined primarily by the amount of blood ejected by each heart beat, stroke volume, versus the volume and elasticity of the major arteries.

A blood squirt, also known as an arterial gush, is the effect when an artery is cut due to the higher arterial pressures. Blood is spurted out at a rapid, intermittent rate, that coincides with the heartbeat. The amount of blood loss can be copious, can occur very rapidly, and be life-threatening.

Over time, factors such as elevated arterial blood sugar (particularly as seen in diabetes mellitus), lipoprotein, cholesterol, high blood pressure, stress and smoking, are all implicated in damaging both the endothelium and walls of the arteries, resulting in atherosclerosis. Atherosclerosis is a disease marked by the hardening of arteries. This is caused by an atheroma or plaque in the artery wall and is a build-up of cell debris, that contain lipids, (cholesterol and fatty acids), calcium and a variable amount of fibrous connective tissue.

Accidental intra-arterial injection either iatrogenically or through recreational drug use can cause symptoms such as intense pain, paresthesia and necrosis. It usually causes permanent damage to the limb; often amputation is necessary.

== History ==
Among the Ancient Greeks before Hippocrates, all blood vessels were called Φλέβες, phlebes. The word arteria then referred to the windpipe. Herophilos was the first to describe anatomical differences between the two types of blood vessel. While Empedocles believed that the blood moved to and fro through the blood vessels, there was no concept of the capillary vessels that join arteries and veins, and there was no notion of circulation. Diogenes of Apollonia developed the theory of pneuma, originally meaning just air but soon identified with the soul itself, and thought to co-exist with the blood in the blood vessels. The arteries were thought to be responsible for the transport of air to the tissues and to be connected to the trachea. This was as a result of finding the arteries of cadavers devoid of blood.

In medieval times, it was supposed that arteries carried a fluid, called "spiritual blood" or "vital spirits", considered to be different from the contents of the veins. This theory went back to Galen. In the late medieval period, the trachea, and ligaments were also called "arteries".

William Harvey described and popularized the modern concept of the circulatory system and the roles of arteries and veins in the 17th century.

Alexis Carrel at the beginning of the 20th century first described the technique for vascular suturing and anastomosis and successfully performed many organ transplantations in animals; he thus actually opened the way to modern vascular surgery that was previously limited to vessels' permanent ligation.
