= Sudhir Kumar Sopory =

Indian educationist and plant physiologist (born 1948)

- Born: 7 January 1948 (age 78); Ambala, Haryana, India
- Education: University of Kashmir (B.S., M.S.); University of Delhi (PhD)
- Occupations: Plant physiologist Educationist
- Awards: Padma Shri; Shanti Swarup Bhatnagar Prize; Chakravorty Award; IBS Birbal Sahni Medal; ISCA Birbal Sahni Birth Centenary Award; NAAS Saligram Sinha Medal; ASPB Corresponding Membership Award; UGC Career Award; ISCA Hira Lal Chakravorty Award; NASI Salgram Sinha Award; ISCA S. S. Katiyar Award; NASI Prof. R. N. Tandon Memorial Award; B. M. Johri Memorial Award; INSA Jawaharlal Nehru Birth Centenary Award; T. N. Khoshoo Memorial Award
- Scientific career
- Fields: Molecular plant physiology

Sudhir Kumar Sopory (born on 7 January 1948) is an Indian educationist, plant physiologist, scientist and former vice chancellor of Jawaharlal Nehru University, New Delhi. He is known to be the first to purify a protein kinase C activity from plants and is credited with the identification of topoisomerase as a substrate of protein kinase C. He is an elected Fellow of several major Indian science academies and The World Academy of Sciences (TWAS) and is a recipient of many honours, including the 1987 Shanti Swarup Bhatnagar Prize, the highest Indian award in the science and technology categories. The Government of India awarded him the fourth highest civilian honour of the Padma Shri, in 2007, for his contributions to science and technology.

== Biography ==
Born on 7 January 1948, Sopory secured his graduate degree (BSc) in 1966 and postgraduate degree (MSc) in 1968 from Sri Pratap College, Sri Nagar of the University of Kashmir. Subsequently, he moved to Delhi to start his career by joining University of Delhi as a member of faculty and pursued his doctoral studies there to obtain a PhD in plant molecular biology in 1973. After securing the doctoral degree, he joined Jawaharlal Nehru University in 1973 as an assistant professor and worked there till his superannuation in 1996, holding positions such as associate professor (1978–1984), professor (1985–1996) and Hostel warden. In between, he worked at various overseas educational institutions; Max Planck Institute for Plant Breeding Research, Cologne, (1976–1978), University of Texas at their Department of Botany as a visiting Fulbright fellow (1981–1982), USDA Plant Molecular Biology Laboratory, Maryland and the Ludwig-Maximilians-Universität München as a visiting Humboldt Professor (1991–1992). After his superannuation, he joined International Centre for Genetic Engineering and Biotechnology (ICGEB) New Delhi, as a group leader of research in plant molecular biology in 1997, and became the interim director of the institution in 2010. In 2011, he was appointed as the vice chancellor of Jawaharlal Nehru University, a post he held till 13 January 2016).

== Legacy ==
During his researches at Max Planck Institute for Plant Breeding Research, Cologne, Sopory developed a plant breeding methodology to produce monohaploids of potato, in 1978. His researches at University of Texas assisted in the discovery of the "role of calcium and calmodulin" in higher plants and, while in Maryland, he worked on D1 protein to find the mechanism behind it. In the early Nineties, he worked under R. Hermann on promoter analysis of light regulated genes encoding proteins involved in photosynthesis. His researches on the gene expression and the activity of nitrate reductase revealed the effect of light on the turnover of phosphoinositide cycle. This helped explain light signal transduction in plants.

Sopory is reported to be the first to purify a Protein Kinase C from plants and he has been successful in identifying topoisomerase I as a substrate of Protein Kinase C in plants. Based on his work on dehydration stress and salinity-related gene regulation, he is known to have developed a new methodology for gene amplification and a Polymerase chain reaction-based protocol for manipulating differentially-expressed genes and their promoters. Working on rice (Oryza sativa) and Pennisetum, he evolved new methodologies for producing stress tolerant transgenic plants. His researches on glyoxalase system in plants explained how it affected the stress environment and he propounded a process how transgenic plants capable of growing in conditions of high salinity could be developed by manipulating glyoxalase I and glyoxalase II, two enzymes related to the detoxification of methylglyoxal, the organic compound known to increase the level of stress response of plants.

Sopory's researches have been documented in over 250 articles published in peer reviewed journals; ResearchGate, an online repository of science articles have listed 242 of them. He has been the editor of 13 books on the subject and has contributed 53 chapters to books written/edited by others besides co-authoring the Hostel Manual for Jawaharlal Nehru University. He is the president of the Indian Society of Plant Physiology and the vice president of the National Academy of Sciences, India, Allahabad. He has served as the vice president of such organizations as Indian Society for Plant Physiology and Biochemistry (2001–2003), Indian National Science Academy (2004–2006) and the Society for Plant Biochemistry and Biotechnology, New Delhi (2009–2011) and is a former secretary of the Plant Tissue Culture Association of India (2001–2010).

During his stint as the vice chancellor at Jawaharlal Nehru University, the institution is reported to have acquired a new 1000-acre campus in South Delhi. The university started new doctoral research courses in Energy studies, Human rights, Silk Route studies, Climate change and Biotechnology and inaugurated a new website and a cyber library during this period. He has also mentored many students in their doctoral studies.

== Awards and honours ==
Four of the major Indian science academies have elected Sopory as their fellow; The Indian Academy of Sciences (IAS) in 1992, National Academy of Sciences, India (NASI) in 1993, the Indian National Science Academy (INSA) the next year, and the National Academy of Agricultural Sciences (NAAS) in 2002. The World Academy of Sciences (TWAS) followed suit in 2005. He has delivered many notable award lectures such as Gadgil Memorial Award Lecture (2000) of the Plant Tissue Culture Association, P. Maheshwari Award Lecture (200) and Sisir Kumar Mitra Memorial Lecture Award (2011–2012) of the Indian National Science Academy, Platinum Jubilee Award Lecture (2003) of the Indian Science Congress Association, N. Narayana Memorial Award Lecture (2005) of the Indian Institute of Sciences, Bangalore, G. V. Joshi Lecture Award (2010) of the Indian Society of Plant Physiology, and NCL Foundation Day lecture (2015) of the National Chemical Laboratory,(CSIR) Pune. R. N. Singh Memorial Lecture (2000) of Banaras Hindu University, Varanasi, Panchanan Maheshwari Memorial Lecture (2001) of Delhi University, N. B. Das Memorial Award Lecture (2002) of the Society of Plant Biochemistry and Biotechnology, Tenth Godnev Award lecture (2003) of the Belarus Academy of Sciences, Dr. Yellapragada Subba Row Award Lecture (2009) of Indraprastha University, Delhi, First H. C. Arya Lecture Award (2011) of the Plant Tissue Culture Association ( India), Dr. Gopinath Sahu Memorial Award Lecture (2014) of the Central Rice Research Institute, Cuttack, and Padmapani Award Lecture (2014) at Tibet House, Delhi are some of the other lectures delivered by him. S. P. Ray-Chaudhuri 75th Birthday Endowment Lecture Award of the Indian Society of Cell Biology, delivered in 2009 was the first instance a plant biologist was given the opportunity to deliver the address.

In 1985, Sopory received the Career Award of the University Grants Commission, followed by Professor Hira Lal Chakravorty Award of the Indian Science Congress Association, the next year. One year later, the Council of Scientific and Industrial Research (CSIR) awarded him the Shanti Swarup Bhatnagar Prize, the highest Indian award for achievement in science and technology. The year 2001 brought him two awards, Salgram Sinha Award of the National Academy of Sciences, India and Birbal Sahni Medal of the Indian Botanical Society. The Indian Science Congress Association (ISCA) honoured him with the Birbal Sahni Centenary Gold Medal Award for Life Time Achievement in 2005 and he was included in the Republic Day honours list of 2007 by the Government of India for the civilian honour of the Padma Shri. Another ISCA award, S. S. Katiyar Award, reached him in 2010, the same year as he received the Corresponding Membership Award for Non-USA scientists of the American Society of Plant Biology, thus becoming the first Indian to receive the award. Two more awards followed in 2012, Prof. R. N. Tandon Memorial Award of the National Academy of Sciences, India and B. M. Johri Memorial Award of the Society of Plant Research. The same year, he was awarded the degree of Doctor of Science (honoris causa) by the Banaras Hindu University and, in 2014, he received another DSc degree, from Rani Durgavati University, Jabalpur. He received two more awards in 2014, Jawaharlal Nehru Birth Centenary Award of the Indian National Science Academy and T. N. Khoshoo Memorial Award of the Orchid Society of India.

== See also ==
- Gene expression
- Regulation of gene expression
- Jawaharlal Nehru University, Delhi
