= C11H18N4O3 =

The molecular formula C_{11}H_{18}N_{4}O_{3} may refer to:

- Argpyrimidine, an advanced glycation end-product
- Imuracetam, a drug of the racetam family
