= Methylglyoxal reductase (NADPH-dependent) =

methylglyoxal reductase (NADPH-dependent)

Identifiers
- EC no.: 1.1.1.283

Databases
- IntEnz: IntEnz view
- BRENDA: BRENDA entry
- ExPASy: NiceZyme view
- KEGG: KEGG entry
- MetaCyc: metabolic pathway
- PRIAM: profile
- PDB structures: RCSB PDB PDBe PDBsum
- Gene Ontology: AmiGO / QuickGO
Search
- PMC: articles
- PubMed: articles
- NCBI: proteins

In enzymology, methylglyoxal reductase (NADPH-dependent) (EC 1.1.1.283) is an enzyme that catalyzes the chemical reaction

(S)-lactaldehyde
+ NADP^{+}
H^{+}
H^{+}
methylglyoxal
+ NADPH

The two substrates of this enzyme are (S)-lactaldehyde and oxidised nicotinamide adenine dinucleotide phosphate (NADP^{+}). Its products are methylglyoxal, reduced NADPH, and a proton.

This enzyme belongs to the family of oxidoreductases, specifically those acting on the CH-OH group of donor with NAD^{+} or NADP^{+} as acceptor. The systematic name of this enzyme class is lactaldehyde:NADP^{+} oxidoreductase. Other names in common use include lactaldehyde dehydrogenase (NADP^{+}), and Gre2.
