= Methylglyoxal reductase (NADH-dependent) =

Class of enzymes

methylglyoxal reductase (NADH-dependent)

Identifiers
- EC no.: 1.1.1.78
- CAS no.: 37250-16-1

Databases
- IntEnz: IntEnz view
- BRENDA: BRENDA entry
- ExPASy: NiceZyme view
- KEGG: KEGG entry
- MetaCyc: metabolic pathway
- PRIAM: profile
- PDB structures: RCSB PDB PDBe PDBsum
- Gene Ontology: AmiGO / QuickGO
Search
- PMC: articles
- PubMed: articles
- NCBI: proteins

In enzymology, methylglyoxal reductase (NADH-dependent) (EC 1.1.1.78) is an enzyme that catalyzes the chemical reaction

(R)-lactaldehyde
+ NAD^{+}
H^{+}
H^{+}
methylglyoxal
+ NADH

The two substrates of this enzyme are (R)-lactaldehyde and oxidised nicotinamide adenine dinucleotide (NAD^{+}). Its products are methylglyoxal, reduced NADH, and a proton.

This enzyme belongs to the family of oxidoreductases, specifically those acting on the CH-OH group of donor with NAD^{+} or NADP^{+} as acceptor. The systematic name of this enzyme class is (R)-lactaldehyde:NAD^{+} oxidoreductase. Other names in common use include methylglyoxal reductase, and D-lactaldehyde dehydrogenase. This enzyme participates in pyruvate metabolism.
