= Lactaldehyde reductase (NADPH) =

Enzyme class

lactaldehyde reductase (NADPH)

Identifiers
- EC no.: 1.1.1.55
- CAS no.: 9028-43-7

Databases
- IntEnz: IntEnz view
- BRENDA: BRENDA entry
- ExPASy: NiceZyme view
- KEGG: KEGG entry
- MetaCyc: metabolic pathway
- PRIAM: profile
- PDB structures: RCSB PDB PDBe PDBsum
- Gene Ontology: AmiGO / QuickGO
Search
- PMC: articles
- PubMed: articles
- NCBI: proteins

In enzymology, a lactaldehyde reductase (NADPH) (EC 1.1.1.55) is an enzyme that catalyzes the chemical reaction

Propylene glycol
+ NADP^{+}
H^{+}
H^{+}
L-Lactaldehyde
+ NADPH

The two substrates of this enzyme are propylene glycol and oxidised nicotinamide adenine dinucleotide phosphate (NADP^{+}). Its products are L-lactaldehyde, reduced NADPH, and a proton.

This enzyme belongs to the family of oxidoreductases, specifically those acting on the CH-OH group of donor with NAD^{+} or NADP^{+} as acceptor. The systematic name of this enzyme class is propane-1,2-diol:NADP^{+} oxidoreductase. Other names in common use include lactaldehyde (reduced nicotinamide adenine dinucleotide phosphate), reductase, NADP^{+}-1,2-propanediol dehydrogenase, propanediol dehydrogenase, 1,2-propanediol:NADP^{+} oxidoreductase, and lactaldehyde reductase (NADPH).
