= Lactaldehyde reductase =

lactaldehyde reductase

Identifiers
- EC no.: 1.1.1.77
- CAS no.: 37250-15-0

Databases
- IntEnz: IntEnz view
- BRENDA: BRENDA entry
- ExPASy: NiceZyme view
- KEGG: KEGG entry
- MetaCyc: metabolic pathway
- PRIAM: profile
- PDB structures: RCSB PDB PDBe PDBsum
- Gene Ontology: AmiGO / QuickGO
Search
- PMC: articles
- PubMed: articles
- NCBI: proteins

In enzymology, lactaldehyde reductase (EC 1.1.1.77) is an enzyme that catalyzes two chemical reactions

(R)-propane-1,2-diol
+ NAD^{+}
H^{+}
H^{+}
(R)-lactaldehyde
+ NADH
(S)-propane-1,2-diol
+ NAD^{+}
H^{+}
H^{+}
(S)-lactaldehyde
+ NADH

Each individual reaction is stereospecific so that when the substrate of the enzyme is (R)-propane-1,2-diol it produces (R)-lactaldehyde but the enantiomeric substrate (S)-propane-1,2-diol gives only (S)-lactaldehyde. The enzyme's cofactor is nicotinamide adenine dinucleotide (NAD^{+}), which is converted to NADH, and also releases a proton.

This enzyme belongs to the family of oxidoreductases, specifically those acting on the CH-OH group of donor with NAD^{+} or NADP^{+} as acceptor. The systematic name of this enzyme class is (R)[or (S)]-propane-1,2-diol:NAD^{+} oxidoreductase. Other names in common use include propanediol:nicotinamide adenine dinucleotide (NAD^{+}) oxidoreductase, and L-lactaldehyde:propanediol oxidoreductase. This enzyme participates in pyruvate metabolism and glyoxylate and dicarboxylate metabolism.

== Structural studies ==
As of late 2007, 3 structures have been solved for this class of enzymes, with PDB accession codes 1RRM, 2BI4, and 2BL4.
