= Lactoylglutathione lyase =

Protein-coding gene in the species Homo sapiens

lactoylglutathione lyase
- Ribbon diagram of human glyoxalase I with its catalytic zinc ions shown as two purple spheres. An inhibitor, S-hexylglutathione, is shown as a space-filling model; the green, red, blue and yellow spheres correspond to carbon, oxygen, nitrogen and sulfur atoms, respectively.

Identifiers
- EC no.: 4.4.1.5
- CAS no.: 9033-12-9

Databases
- IntEnz: IntEnz view
- BRENDA: BRENDA entry
- ExPASy: NiceZyme view
- KEGG: KEGG entry
- MetaCyc: metabolic pathway
- PRIAM: profile
- PDB structures: RCSB PDB PDBe PDBsum
- Gene Ontology: AmiGO / QuickGO
Search
- PMC: articles
- PubMed: articles
- NCBI: proteins

The enzyme lactoylglutathione lyase (EC 4.4.1.5, also known as glyoxalase I) catalyzes the isomerization of hemithioacetal adducts, which are formed in a spontaneous reaction between a glutathionyl group and aldehydes such as methylglyoxal.

(R)-S-lactoylglutathione = glutathione + 2-oxopropanal

Glyoxalase I derives its name from its catalysis of the first step in the glyoxalase system, a critical two-step detoxification system for methylglyoxal. Methylglyoxal is produced naturally as a byproduct of normal biochemistry, but is highly toxic, due to its chemical reactions with proteins, nucleic acids, and other cellular components. The second detoxification step, in which (R)-S-lactoylglutathione is split into glutathione and D-lactate, is carried out by glyoxalase II, a hydrolase. Unusually, these reactions carried out by the glyoxalase system does not oxidize glutathione, which usually acts as a redox coenzyme. Although aldose reductase can also detoxify methylglyoxal, the glyoxalase system is more efficient and seems to be the most important of these pathways. Glyoxalase I is an attractive target for the development of drugs to treat infections by some parasitic protozoa, and cancer. Several inhibitors of glyoxalase I have been identified, such as S-(N-hydroxy-N-methylcarbamoyl)glutathione.

Glyoxalase I is classified as a carbon-sulfur lyase although, strictly speaking, the enzyme does not form or break a carbon-sulfur bond. Rather, the enzyme shifts two hydrogen atoms from one carbon atom of the methylglyoxal to the adjacent carbon atom. In effect, the reaction is an intramolecular redox reaction; one carbon is oxidized whereas the other is reduced. The mechanism proceeds by subtracting and then adding protons, forming an enediolate intermediate, rather than by transferring hydrides. Unusually for a metalloprotein, this enzyme shows activity with several different metals. Glyoxalase I is also unusual in that it is stereospecific in the second half of its mechanism, but not in the first half. Structurally, the enzyme is a domain-swapped dimer in many species, although the two subunits have merged into a monomer in yeast, through gene duplication.

== Nomenclature ==
The systematic name of this enzyme class is (R)-S-lactoylglutathione methylglyoxal-lyase (isomerizing; glutathione-forming); other names include:

- methylglyoxalase,
- aldoketomutase,
- ketone-aldehyde mutase, and
- (R)-S-lactoylglutathione methylglyoxal-lyase (isomerizing).

In some instances, the glutathionyl moiety may be supplied by trypanothione, the analog of glutathione in parasitic protozoa such as the trypanosomes. The human gene for this enzyme is called GLO1.

== Gene ==
GLO1
Available structures
PDB	Ortholog search: PDBe RCSB
PDB	List of PDB id codes 1BH5, 1FRO, 1QIN, 1QIP, 3VW9, 3W0T, 3W0U

Identifiers
- Aliases: GLO1, GLOD1, GLYI, HEL-S-74, glyoxalase I
- External IDs: OMIM: 138750; MGI: 95742; HomoloGene: 4880; GeneCards: GLO1; OMA:GLO1 - orthologs

Gene location (Human)
Chr.	Chromosome 6 (human)
Band	6p21.2	Start	38,675,925 bp
Band	6p21.2	End	38,703,145 bp

Gene location (Mouse)
Chr.	Chromosome 17 (mouse)
Band	17 A3.3|17 15.69 cM	Start	30,803,910 bp
Band	17 A3.3|17 15.69 cM	End	30,845,845 bp
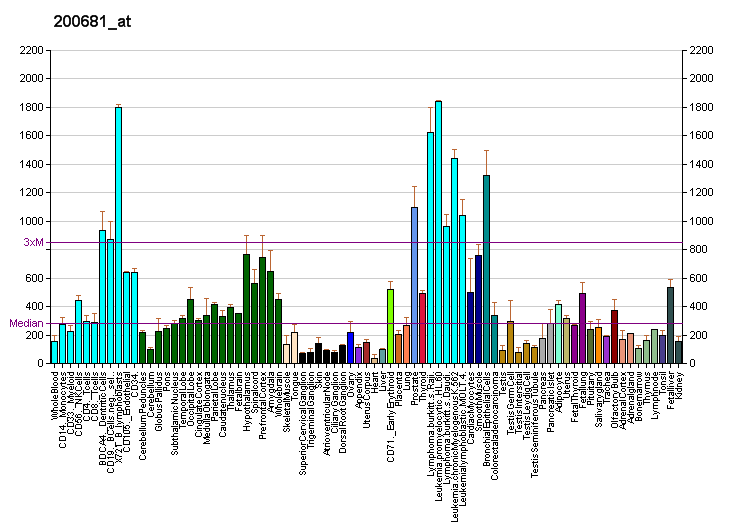
RNA expression pattern
Bgee	Human / Mouse (ortholog); Top expressed in: corpus epididymis; middle temporal gyrus; jejunal mucosa; caput epididymis; glutes; Epithelium of choroid plexus; retinal pigment epithelium; Skeletal muscle tissue of rectus abdominis; duodenum; ventricular zone / Top expressed in: pineal gland; deep cerebellar nuclei; retinal pigment epithelium; medial vestibular nucleus; medial geniculate nucleus; arcuate nucleus; medial dorsal nucleus; substantia nigra; lateral geniculate nucleus; median eminence; More reference expression data
BioGPS	More reference expression data
Gene ontology
Molecular function	lactoylglutathione lyase activity; zinc ion binding; metal ion binding; lyase activity
Cellular component	cytoplasm; extracellular exosome; nucleus; cytosol; plasma membrane
Biological process	regulation of transcription by RNA polymerase II; osteoclast differentiation; negative regulation of apoptotic process; methylglyoxal metabolic process; glutathione metabolic process; pyruvate metabolic process; carbohydrate metabolic process
Sources:Amigo / QuickGO
Orthologs
Species	Human	Mouse
Entrez	2739	109801
Ensembl	ENSG00000124767	ENSMUSG00000024026
UniProt	Q04760	Q9CPU0
RefSeq (mRNA)	NM_006708	NM_001113560; NM_025374
RefSeq (protein)	NP_006699	NP_001107032; NP_079650
Location (UCSC)	Chr 6: 38.68 – 38.7 Mb	Chr 17: 30.8 – 30.85 Mb
PubMed search
- Wikidata
View/Edit Human	View/Edit Mouse

Lactoylglutathione lyase in humans is encoded by the GLO1 gene.

== Structure ==
Several structures of glyoxalase I have been solved. Four structures of the human form have been published, with PDB accession codes PDB: 1BH5, PDB: 1FRO, PDB: 1QIN, and PDB: 1QIP. Five structures of the Escherichia coli form have been published, with accession codes PDB: 1FA5, PDB: 1FA6, PDB: 1FA7, PDB: 1FA8, and PDB: 1F9Z. Finally, one structure of the trypanothione-specific version from Leishmania major has been solved, PDB: 2C21. In all these cases, the quaternary structure of the biological unit is a domain-swapped dimer, in which the active site and the 8-stranded beta sheet secondary structure is formed from both subunits. However, in yeast such as Saccharomyces cerevisiae, the two subunits have fused into a single monomer of double size, through gene duplication. Each half of the structural dimer is a sandwich of 3-4 alpha helices on both sides of an 8-stranded antiparallel beta sheet; the dimer interface is largely composed of the face-to-face meeting of the two beta sheets.

The tertiary and quaternary structures of glyoxalase I is similar to those of several other types of proteins. For example, glyoxalase I resembles several proteins that allow bacteria to resist antibiotics such as fosfomycin, bleomycin and mitomycin. Likewise, the unrelated enzymes methylmalonyl-CoA epimerase, 3-demethylubiquinone-9 3-O-methyltransferase and numerous dioxygenases such as biphenyl-2,3-diol 1,2-dioxygenase, catechol 2,3-dioxygenase, 3,4-dihydroxyphenylacetate 2,3-dioxygenase and 4-hydroxyphenylpyruvate dioxygenase all resemble glyoxalase I in structure. Finally, many proteins of unknown or uncertain function likewise resemble glyoxalase I, such as At5g48480 from the plant, Arabidopsis thaliana.

The active site has four major regions.

== Function ==
Methylglyoxal.

The principal physiological function of glyoxalase I is the detoxification of methylglyoxal, a reactive 2-oxoaldehyde that is cytostatic at low concentrations and cytotoxic at millimolar concentrations. Methylglyoxal is a by-product of normal biochemistry that is a carcinogen, a mutagen and can chemically damage several components of the cell, such as proteins and nucleic acids. Methylglyoxal is formed spontaneously from dihydroxyacetone phosphate, enzymatically by triosephosphate isomerase and methylglyoxal synthase, as also in the catabolism of threonine.

To minimize the amount of toxic methylglyoxal and other reactive 2-oxoaldehydes, the glyoxalase system has evolved. The methylglyoxal reacts spontaneously with reduced glutathione (or its equivalent, trypanothione),) forming a hemithioacetal. The glyoxalase system converts such compounds into D-lactate and restored the glutathione. In this conversion, the two carbonyl carbons of the 2-oxoaldehyde are oxidized and reduced, respectively, the aldehyde being oxidized to a carboxylic acid and the acetal group being reduced to an alcohol. The glyoxalase system evolved very early in life's history and is found nearly universally through life-forms.

The glyoaxalase system consists of two enzymes, glyoxalase I and glyoxalase II. The former enzyme, described here, rearranges the hemithioacetal formed naturally by the attack of glutathione on methylglyoxal into the product. Glyoxalase II hydrolyzes the product to re-form the glutathione and produce D-lactate. Thus, glutathione acts unusually as a coenzyme and is required only in catalytic (i.e., very small) amounts; normally, glutathione acts instead as a redox couple in oxidation-reduction reactions.

The glyoxalase system has also been suggested to play a role in regulating cell growth and in assembling microtubules.

== Properties ==
Glyoxalase I requires bound metal ions for catalysis. The human enzyme and its counterparts in yeast (Saccharomyces cerevisiae) and Pseudomonas putida use divalent zinc, Zn^{2+}. By contrast, the prokaryotic versions often use a nickel ion. The glyoxalase I found in eukaryotic trypanosomal parasites such as Leishmania major and Trypanosoma cruzi can also use nickel for activity, possibly reflecting an acquisition of their GLO1 gene by horizontal gene transfer.

A property of glyoxalase I is its lack of specificity for the catalytic metal ion. Most enzymes bind one particular type of metal, and their catalytic activity depends on having bound that metal. For example, oxidoreductases often use a specific metal ion such as iron, manganese or copper and will fail to function if their preferred metal ion is replaced, due to differences in the redox potential; thus, the ferrous superoxide dismutase cannot function if its catalytic iron is replaced by manganese, and vice versa. By contrast, although human glyoxalase I prefers to use divalent zinc, it is able to function with many other divalent metals, including magnesium, manganese, cobalt, nickel and even calcium; however, the enzyme is inactive with the ferrous cation. Similarly, although the prokaryotic glyoxalase I prefers nickel, it is able to function with cobalt, manganese and cadmium; however, the enzyme is inert with bound zinc, due to a change in coordination geometry from octahedral to trigonal bipyramidal. Structural and computational studies have revealed that the metal binds the two carbonyl oxygens of the methylglyoxal moiety at two of its coordination sites, stabilizing the enediolate anion intermediate.

Another unusual property of glyoxalase I is its inconsistent stereospecificity. The first step of its reaction mechanism (the abstraction of the proton from C_{1} and subsequent protonation of O_{2}) is not stereospecific and works equally well regardless of the initial chirality at C_{1} in the hemithioacetal substrate. The resulting enediolate intermediate is achiral, but the second step of the reaction mechanism (the abstraction of a proton from O_{1} and subsequent protonation of C_{2}) is definitely stereospecific, producing only the (S) form of D-lactoylglutathione. This is believed to result from the two glutamates bound oppositely on the metal ion; either one is able to carry out the first step, but only one is able to carry out the second step. The reason from this asymmetry is not yet fully determined.

== Reaction mechanism ==
The methylglyoxal molecule consists of two carbonyl groups flanked by a hydrogen atom and a methyl group. In the discussion below, these two carbonyl carbons will be denoted as C1 and C2, respectively. In both the hemithioacetal substrate and the (R)-S-lactoylglutathione product, the glutathione moiety is bonded to the C1 carbonyl group.

The basic mechanism of glyoxalase I is as follows. The substrate hemithioacetal is formed when a molecule of glutathione — probably in its reactive thiolate form — attacks the C1 carbonyl of methylglyoxal or a related compound, rendering that carbon tetravalent. This reaction occurs spontaneously in the cell, without the involvement of the enzyme. This hemithioacetal is then bound by the enzyme, which shifts a hydrogen from C1 to C2. The C2 carbonyl is reduced to a tetravalent alcohol form by the addition of two protons, whereas the C1 carbonyl is restored by losing a hydrogen while retaining its bond to the glutathione moiety.

A computational study, combined with the available experimental data, suggests the following atomic-resolution mechanism for glyoxalase I. In the active site, the catalytic metal adopts an octahedral coordination geometry and, in the absence of substrate, binds two waters, two opposite glutamates, a histidine and one other sidechain, usually another histidine or glutamates. When the substrate enters the active site, the two waters are shed and the two carbonyl oxygens of the substrate are bound directly to the metal ion. The two opposing glutamates add and subtract protons from C1 and C2 and their respective oxygens, O1 and O2. The first half of the reaction transfers a proton from C1 to O2, whereas the second half transfers a proton from O1 to C2. The former reaction may be carried out by either of the opposing glutamates, depending on the initial chirality of C1 in the hemithioacetal substrate; however, the second half is stereospecific and is carried out by only one of the opposing glutamates.

It is worthy to note that the first theoretically confirmed mechanism for the R-substrate of glyoxalase one published recently.

The catalytic mechanism of Glyoxalase has been studied by density functional theory, molecular dynamics simulations and hybrid QM/MM methods. The reason for the special specificity of the enzyme (it accepts both enantiomers of its chiral substrate but converts them to the same enantiomer of the product) is the higher basicity and flexibility of one of the active site glutamates (Glu172).

=== Proton vs. hydride transfer ===
Glyoxalase I was originally believed to operate by the transfer of a hydride, which is a proton surrounded by two electrons (H^{–}). In this, it was thought to resemble the classic Cannizzaro reaction mechanism, in which the attack of a hydroxylate on an aldehyde renders it into a tetravalent alcohol anion; this anion donates its hydrogens to a second aldehyde, forming a carboxylic acid and an alcohol. (In effect, two identical aldehydes reduce and oxidize each other, leaving the net oxidation state the same.)

In glyoxalase I, such a hydride-transfer mechanism would work as follows. The attack of the glutathione would leave a charged O^{–} and the aldehyde hydrogen bound to C_{1}. If the carbonyl oxygen of C_{2} can secure a hydrogen from an obliging acidic sidechain of the enzyme, forming an alcohol, then the hydrogen of C_{1} might simultaneously slide over with its electrons onto C_{2} (the hydride transfer). At the same time, the extra electron on the oxygen of C_{1} could reform the double bond of the carbonyl, thus giving the final product.

An alternative (and ultimately correct) mechanism using proton (H^{+}) transfer was put forward in the 1970s. In this mechanism, a basic sidechain of the enzyme abstracts the aldehyde proton from C_{1}; at the same time, a proton is added to the oxygen of C_{2}, thus forming a enediol. The ene means that a double bond has formed between C_{2} and C_{1}, from the electrons left behind by the abstraction of the aldehyde proton; the diol refers to the fact that two alcohols have been made of the initial two carbonyl groups. In this mechanism, the intermediate forms the product by adding another proton to C_{2}.

It was expected that solvent protons would contribute to forming the product from the enediol intermediate of the proton-transfer mechanism and when such contributions were not observed in tritiated water, ^{3}H_{1}O, the hydride-transfer mechanism was favored. However, an alternate hypothesis — that the enzyme active site was deeply buried away from water — could not be ruled out and ultimately proved to be correct. The first indications came when ever-increasing temperatures showed ever-increasing incorporation of tritium, which is consistent with proton transfer and unexpected by hydride transfer. The clinching evidence can with studies of the hydrogen-deuterium isotope effect on substrates fluorinated on the methyl group and deuterated on the aldehyde. The fluoride is a good leaving group; the hydride-transfer mechanism predicts less fluoride ion elimination with the deuterated sample, whereas the proton-transfer mechanism predicts more. Experiments on three types of glyoxalase I (yeast, rat and mouse forms) supported the proton-transfer mechanism in every case. This mechanism was finally observed in crystal structures of glyoxalase I.

== Clinical significance ==
=== Behavior ===
Glo1 expression is correlated with differences in anxiety-like behavior in mice as well as behavior in the tail suspension test, which is sensitive to antidepressant drugs; however, the direction of these effects have not always been consistent, which has raised skepticism. Differences in Glo1 expression in mice appear to be caused by a copy number variant that is common among inbred strains of mice. It has been proposed that the behavioral effects of Glo1 are due to the activity of its principal substrate methylglyoxal at GABA_{A} receptors. A small molecule inhibitor of glyoxalase I has been shown to have anxiolytic properties, thus identifying another possible indication for inhibitors of Glyoxalase I.

=== As a drug target ===
Glyoxalase I is a target for the development of pharmaceuticals against bacteria, protozoans (especially Trypanosoma cruzi and the Leishmania) and human cancer. Numerous inhibitors have been developed, most of which share the glutathione moiety. Among the most tightly binding family of inhibitors to the human enzyme are derivatives of S-(N-aryl-N-hydroxycarbamoyl)glutathione, most notably the p-bromophenyl derivative, which has a dissociation constant of 14 nM. The closest analog of the transition state is believed to be S-(N-hydroxy-N-p-iodophenylcarbamoyl)glutathione; the crystal structure of this compound bound to the human enzyme has been solved to 2 Å resolution (PDB accession code PDB: 1QIN).

Experiments suggest that methylglyoxal is preferentially toxic to proliferating cells, such as those in cancer.

Recent research demonstrates that GLO1 expression is upregulated in various human malignant tumors including metastatic melanoma.
