= Hemithioacetal =

Organosulfur compound of the form –CH(–OH)S–

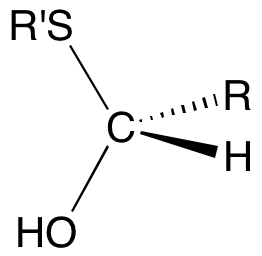
Hemithioacetal functional group

In organic chemistry, hemithioacetals (or thiohemiacetals) are organosulfur compounds with the general formula R−CH(−OH)−SR’. They are the sulfur analogues of the acetals, R−CH(−OH)−OR’, with an oxygen atom replaced by sulfur (as implied by the thio- prefix). Because they consist of four differing substituents on a single carbon, hemithioacetals are chiral. A related family of compounds are the dithiohemiacetals, with the formula R−CH(−SH)−SR’. Although they can be important intermediates, hemithioacetals are usually not isolated, since they exist in equilibrium with thiols (−SH) and aldehydes (−CH=O).

== Formation and structure ==
Hemithioacetals are formed by the reaction of a thiol (R−SH) and an aldehyde (R−CH=O):

$$\ce{R-CHO + R'-SH <=> R-CH(OH)S-R'}$$

Hemithioacetals usually arise via acid catalysis. They typically are intermediates in the formation of dithioacetals (R−CH(S−R’)_{2}):

$$\ce{R-CH(OH)S-R' + R'-SH <=> R-CH(S-R')2 + H2O}$$

== Isolable hemithioacetal ==
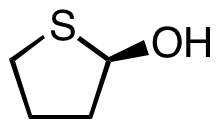
2-Hydroxytetrahydrothiophene is a rare example of a hemithioacetal that can be isolated.

Hemithioacetals ordinarily readily dissociate into thiol and aldehyde, however, some have been isolated. In general, these isolable hemithioacetals are cyclic, which disfavors dissociation, and can often be further stabilized by the presence of acid. An important class are S-glycosides, such as octylthioglucoside, which are formed by a reaction between thiols and sugars. Other examples include 2-hydroxytetrahydrothiophene and the anti-HIV drug Lamivudine. Another class of isolable hemithioacetals are derived from carbonyl groups that form stable hydrates. For example, thiols react with hexafluoroacetone trihydrate to give hemithioacetals, which can be isolated.

== Hemithioacetals in nature ==
Glyoxalase I, which is part of the glyoxalase system present in the cytosol, catalyzes the conversion of α-oxoaldehyde (RC(O)CHO) and the thiol glutathione (abbreviated GSH) to S-2-hydroxyacylglutathione derivatives [RCH(OH)CO-SG]. The catalytic mechanism involves an intermediate hemithioacetal adduct [RCOCH(OH)-SG]. The spontaneous reaction forms methylglyoxal-glutathione hemithioacetal and human glyoxalase I.

A hemithioacetal is also invoked in the mechanism of prenylcysteine lyase. In catalytic mechanism, S-farnesylcysteine is oxidized by a flavin to a thiocarbenium ion. The thiocarbenium ion hydrolyzes to form the hemithioacetal:

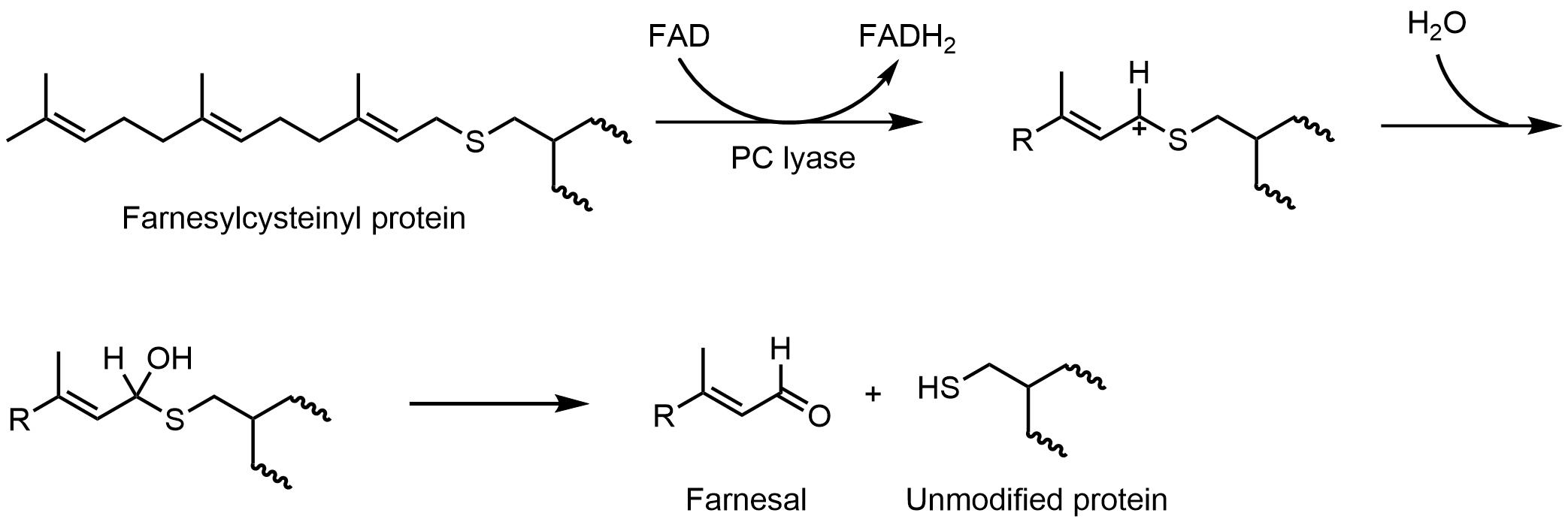

After formation, the hemithioacetal breaks into hydrogen peroxide, farnesal, and cysteine.
