= PCYOX1 =

Protein-coding gene in the species Homo sapiens

Identifiers
- Aliases: PCYOX1, PCL1, prenylcysteine oxidase 1
- External IDs: OMIM: 610995; MGI: 1914131; GeneCards: PCYOX1
Enzyme activity
EC #	BRENDA	ExPASy	KEGG	MetaCyc
1.8.3.5	↗	↗	↗	↗

Gene location (Human)
Chr.	Chromosome 2 (human)
Band	2p13.3	Start	70,257,386 bp
Band	2p13.3	End	70,281,185 bp

Gene location (Mouse)
Chr.	Chromosome 6 (mouse)
Band	6|6 D1	Start	86,362,988 bp
Band	6|6 D1	End	86,374,136 bp
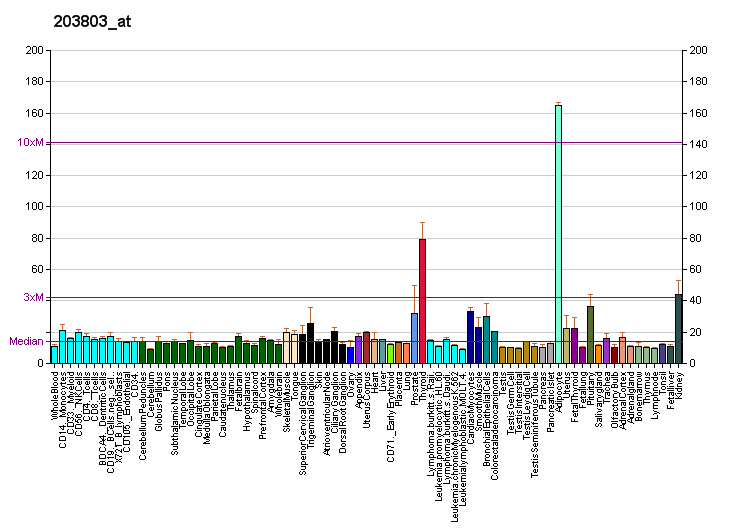
RNA expression pattern
Bgee	Human / Mouse (ortholog); Top expressed in: parotid gland; endothelial cell; parietal pleura; skin of hip; gingival epithelium; skin of thigh; Skeletal muscle tissue of biceps brachii; Skeletal muscle tissue of rectus abdominis; Brodmann area 23; visceral pleura / Top expressed in: urothelium; medullary collecting duct; transitional epithelium of urinary bladder; facial motor nucleus; cumulus cell; ureter; vestibular sensory epithelium; substantia nigra; Epithelium of choroid plexus; skin of external ear; More reference expression data
BioGPS	More reference expression data
Gene ontology
Molecular function	oxidoreductase activity; oxidoreductase activity, acting on a sulfur group of donors, oxygen as acceptor; prenylcysteine oxidase activity
Cellular component	plasma membrane; extracellular exosome; vacuolar membrane; very-low-density lipoprotein particle; lysosome
Biological process	prenylcysteine metabolic process; chloride transport; chloride transmembrane transport; prenylcysteine catabolic process; prenylated protein catabolic process
Sources:Amigo / QuickGO
Orthologs
Databases	NCBI: entry; OMA: entry
Species	Human	Mouse
Entrez	51449	66881
Ensembl	ENSG00000116005	ENSMUSG00000029998
UniProt	Q9UHG3	Q9CQF9
RefSeq (mRNA)	NM_016297	NM_025823; NM_001355687
RefSeq (protein)	NP_057381	NP_080099; NP_001342616
Location (UCSC)	Chr 2: 70.26 – 70.28 Mb	Chr 6: 86.36 – 86.37 Mb
PubMed search
- Wikidata
View/Edit Human	View/Edit Mouse

Prenylcysteine oxidase 1 is an enzyme that in humans is encoded by the PCYOX1 gene.

== See also ==
- Prenylcysteine oxidase
