= Prenylcysteine oxidase =

prenylcysteine oxidase

Identifiers
- EC no.: 1.8.3.5

Databases
- IntEnz: IntEnz view
- BRENDA: BRENDA entry
- ExPASy: NiceZyme view
- KEGG: KEGG entry
- MetaCyc: metabolic pathway
- PRIAM: profile
- PDB structures: RCSB PDB PDBe PDBsum
- Gene Ontology: AmiGO / QuickGO
Search
- PMC: articles
- PubMed: articles
- NCBI: proteins

In enzymology, a prenylcysteine oxidase (EC 1.8.3.5) is an enzyme that catalyzes the chemical reaction

an S-prenyl-L-cysteine + O_{2} + H_{2}O $\rightleftharpoons$ a prenal + L-cysteine + H_{2}O_{2}

The 3 substrates of this enzyme are S-prenyl-L-cysteine, O_{2}, and H_{2}O, whereas its 3 products are prenal, L-cysteine, and H_{2}O_{2}.

This enzyme belongs to the family of oxidoreductases, specifically those acting on a sulfur group of donors with oxygen as acceptor. The systematic name of this enzyme class is S-prenyl-L-cysteine:oxygen oxidoreductase. This enzyme is also called prenylcysteine lyase.

== Human protein and gene ==
- Prenylcysteine oxidase 1, symbol PCYOX1, gene on chromosome 2

== See also ==
- Hemithioacetals in nature, for mechanism of action
- Flavin adenine dinucleotide, cofactor of the enzyme
- Prenylation, a process forming S-prenyl-L-cysteine
