= TPI1 =

Protein-coding gene in the species Homo sapiens

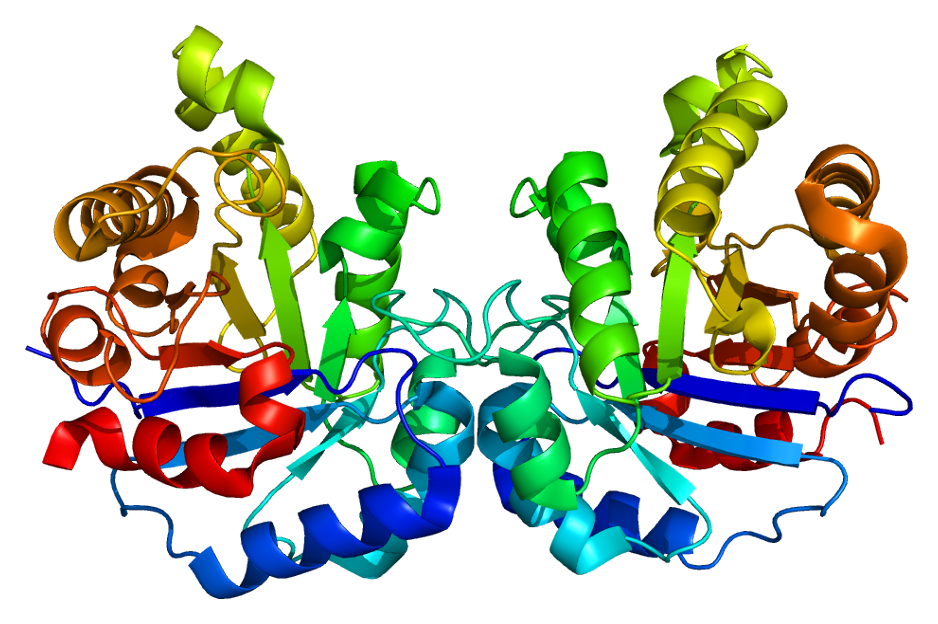

Identifiers
- Aliases: TPI1, HEL-S-49, TIM, TPI, TPID, triosephosphate isomerase 1
- External IDs: OMIM: 190450; MGI: 98797; GeneCards: TPI1
Available structures
PDB	Ortholog search: PDBe RCSB
PDB	List of PDB id codes 2IAN, 1WYI, 4POC, 1HTI, 2VOM, 1KLG, 4BR1, 4E41, 4UNK, 2IAM, 1KLU, 2JK2, 4UNL, 4POD, 4ZVJ
Enzyme activity
EC #	BRENDA	ExPASy	KEGG	MetaCyc
4.2.3.3	↗	↗	↗	↗
5.3.1.1	↗	↗	↗	↗

Gene location (Human)
Chr.	Chromosome 12 (human)
Band	12p13.31	Start	6,867,119 bp
Band	12p13.31	End	6,870,948 bp

Gene location (Mouse)
Chr.	Chromosome 6 (mouse)
Band	6 F2|6 59.17 cM	Start	124,787,549 bp
Band	6 F2|6 59.17 cM	End	124,791,259 bp
RNA expression pattern
Bgee	Human / Mouse (ortholog); Top expressed in: right frontal lobe; prefrontal cortex; right hemisphere of cerebellum; ventricular zone; mucosa of transverse colon; muscle of thigh; Skeletal muscle tissue of rectus abdominis; right adrenal gland; left adrenal gland; right adrenal cortex / Top expressed in: epithelium of small intestine; triceps brachii muscle; sternocleidomastoid muscle; vastus lateralis muscle; temporal muscle; intercostal muscle; tibialis anterior muscle; skeletal muscle tissue; gastrocnemius muscle; facial motor nucleus; More reference expression data
BioGPS	n/a
Gene ontology
Molecular function	triose-phosphate isomerase activity; protein binding; catalytic activity; isomerase activity; ubiquitin protein ligase binding; methylglyoxal synthase activity; protein homodimerization activity; lyase activity
Cellular component	cytosol; extracellular exosome; nucleus; extracellular space; cytoplasm
Biological process	canonical glycolysis; multicellular organism development; gluconeogenesis; pentose-phosphate shunt; metabolism; glyceraldehyde-3-phosphate metabolic process; glycolytic process; glycerol catabolic process; glyceraldehyde-3-phosphate biosynthetic process; glucose metabolic process; methylglyoxal biosynthetic process
Sources:Amigo / QuickGO
Orthologs
Databases	NCBI: entry; OMA: entry
Species	Human	Mouse
Entrez	7167	21991
Ensembl	ENSG00000111669	ENSMUSG00000023456
UniProt	P60174	P17751
RefSeq (mRNA)	NM_001258026; NM_000365; NM_001159287	NM_009415
RefSeq (protein)	NP_000356; NP_001152759; NP_001244955	NP_033441
Location (UCSC)	Chr 12: 6.87 – 6.87 Mb	Chr 6: 124.79 – 124.79 Mb
PubMed search
- Wikidata
View/Edit Human	View/Edit Mouse

Triosephosphate isomerase is an enzyme that in humans is encoded by the TPI1 gene.

This gene encodes an enzyme, consisting of two identical proteins, which catalyzes the isomerization of glyceraldehyde 3-phosphate (G3P) and dihydroxyacetone phosphate (DHAP) in glycolysis and gluconeogenesis. Mutations in this gene are associated with triosephosphate isomerase deficiency. Pseudogenes have been identified on chromosomes 1, 4, 6 and 7. Alternative splicing results in multiple transcript variants.

== Structure ==
Triose Phosphate Isomerase is a member of the alpha and beta (α/β) class of proteins; it is a homodimer, and each subunit contains 247 amino acids. Each TPI1 monomer contains the full set of catalytic residues, but the enzyme is only active in the oligomeric form. Therefore, the enzyme must be in a dimer in order to achieve full function of the enzyme, even though it is not believed that the two active sites participate in cooperativity with each other. Each subunit contains 8 exterior alpha helices surrounding 8 interior beta strands, which form a conserved structural domain called a closed alpha/beta barrel (αβ) or more specifically a TIM barrel. Characteristic of most all TIM barrel domains is the presence of the enzyme's active site in the lower loop regions created by the eight loops that connect the C-termini of the beta strands with the N-termini of the alpha helices. TIM barrel proteins also share a structurally conserved phosphate binding motif, with the phosphate group found in the substrate or cofactors.

In each chain, nonpolar amino acids pointing inward from the beta strands contribute to the hydrophobic core of the structure. The alpha helices are amphipathic: their outer (water-contacting) surfaces are polar, while their inner surfaces are largely hydrophobic.

== Function ==
TPI catalyzes the transfer of a hydrogen atom from carbon 1 to carbon 2, an intramolecular oxidation-reduction reaction. This isomerization of a ketose to an aldose proceeds through an cis-enediol(ate) intermediate. This isomerization proceeds without any cofactors and the enzyme confers a 10^{9} rate enhancement relative to the nonenzymatic reaction involving a chemical base (acetate ion). In addition to its role in glycolysis, TPI is also involved in several additional metabolic biological processes including gluconeogenesis, the pentose phosphate shunt, and fatty acid biosynthesis.

== Clinical significance ==
Triosephosphate isomerase deficiency is a disorder characterized by a shortage of red blood cells (anemia), movement problems, increased susceptibility to infection, and muscle weakness that can affect breathing and heart function. The anemia in this condition begins in infancy. Since the anemia results from the premature breakdown of red blood cells (hemolysis), it is known as hemolytic anemia. A shortage of red blood cells to carry oxygen throughout the body leads to extreme tiredness (fatigue), pale skin (pallor), and shortness of breath. When the red cells are broken down, iron and a molecule called bilirubin are released; individuals with triosephosphate isomerase deficiency have an excess of these substances circulating in the blood. Excess bilirubin in the blood causes jaundice, which is a yellowing of the skin and the whites of the eyes. Movement problems typically become apparent by age 2 in people with triosephosphate isomerase deficiency. The movement problems are caused by impairment of motor neurons, which are specialized nerve cells in the brain and spinal cord that control muscle movement. This impairment leads to muscle weakness and wasting (atrophy) and causes the movement problems typical of triosephosphate isomerase deficiency, including involuntary muscle tensing (dystonia), tremors, and weak muscle tone (hypotonia). Affected individuals may also develop seizures. Weakness of other muscles, such as the heart (a condition known as cardiomyopathy) and the muscle that separates the abdomen from the chest cavity (the diaphragm) can also occur in triosephosphate isomerase deficiency. Diaphragm weakness can cause breathing problems and ultimately leads to respiratory failure. Individuals with triosephosphate isomerase deficiency are at increased risk of developing infections because they have poorly functioning white blood cells. These immune system cells normally recognize and attack foreign invaders, such as viruses and bacteria, to prevent infection. The most common infections in people with triosephosphate isomerase deficiency are bacterial infections of the respiratory tract. People with triosephosphate isomerase deficiency often do not survive past childhood due to respiratory failure. In a few rare cases, affected individuals without severe nerve damage or muscle weakness have lived into adulthood. The deficiency is most commonly caused by mutations in TPI1, although mutations in other isoforms have been identified. A common marker for TPI deficiency is the increased accumulation of DHAP in erythrocyte extracts; this is because the defective enzyme no longer has the ability to catalyze the isomerization to GAP. The point mutation does not affect the catalysis rate, but rather, affects the assembly of the enzyme into a homodimer.

Recent discoveries in Alzheimer's disease research have indicated that amyloid beta peptide-induced nitro-oxidative damage promotes the nitrotyrosination of TPI in human neuroblastoma cells. Nitrosylated TPI was found to be present in brain slides from double transgenic mice over-expressing human amyloid precursor protein as well as in Alzheimer's disease patients. Specifically, the nitrotyrosination occurs on Tyr164 and Tyr208 within the protein, which are near the center of catalysis; this modification correlates with reduced isomerization activity.

== Interactive pathway map ==
Click on genes, proteins and metabolites below to link to respective articles. (Note: The interactive pathway map can be edited at WikiPathways: "GlycolysisGluconeogenesis_WP534".)

Glycolysis and Gluconeogenesis edit

== See also ==
- Triosephosphate isomerase
