= Triosephosphate isomerase deficiency =

- Other names: Triose phosphate-isomerase deficiency
- Triosephosphate isomerase deficiency has an autosomal recessive pattern of inheritance.
- Specialty: Hematology

Triosephosphate isomerase deficiency is a rare autosomal recessive metabolic disorder which was initially described in 1965.

It is a unique glycolytic enzymopathy that is characterized by chronic haemolytic anaemia, cardiomyopathy, susceptibility to infections, severe neurological dysfunction, and, in most cases, death in early childhood. The disease is exceptionally rare with fewer than 100 patients diagnosed worldwide.

== Genetics ==
Thirteen different mutations in the respective gene, which is located at chromosome 12p13 and encodes the ubiquitous housekeeping enzyme triosephosphate isomerase (TPI), have been discovered so far. TPI is a crucial enzyme of glycolysis and catalyzes the interconversion of dihydroxyacetone phosphate and glyceraldehyde-3-phosphate. A marked decrease in TPI activity and an accumulation of dihydroxyacetone phosphate have been detected in erythrocyte extracts of homozygous (two identical mutant alleles) and compound heterozygous (two different mutant alleles) TPI deficiency patients. Heterozygous individuals are clinically unaffected, even if their residual TPI activity is reduced. Recent work suggests that not a direct inactivation, but an alteration in TPI dimerization might underlie the pathology. This might explain why the disease is rare, but inactive TPI alleles have been detected at higher frequency implicating a heterozygote advantage of inactive TPI alleles.

The most common mutation causing TPI deficiency is TPI Glu104Asp. All carriers of the mutation are descendants of a common ancestor, a person that lived in what is today France or England more than 1000 years ago.

== See also ==
- List of hematologic conditions
