= 3,4-dihydroxyphenylacetate 2,3-dioxygenase =

Enzyme

Identifiers
- EC no.: 1.13.11.15
- CAS no.: 37256-56-7

Databases
- IntEnz: IntEnz view
- BRENDA: BRENDA entry
- ExPASy: NiceZyme view
- KEGG: KEGG entry
- MetaCyc: metabolic pathway
- PRIAM: profile
- PDB structures: RCSB PDB PDBe PDBsum
- Gene Ontology: AmiGO / QuickGO
Search
- PMC: articles
- PubMed: articles
- NCBI: proteins

In enzymology, a 3,4-dihydroxyphenylacetate 2,3-dioxygenase (EC 1.13.11.15) is an enzyme that catalyzes the chemical reaction

3,4-dihydroxyphenylacetate + O_{2} $\rightleftharpoons$ 2-hydroxy-5-carboxymethylmuconate semialdehyde

Thus, the two substrates of this enzyme are 3,4-dihydroxyphenylacetate and O_{2}, whereas its product is 2-hydroxy-5-carboxymethylmuconate semialdehyde.

This enzyme belongs to the family of oxidoreductases, specifically those acting on single donors with O_{2} as oxidant and incorporation of two atoms of oxygen into the substrate (oxygenases). The oxygen incorporated need not be derived from O_{2}. The systematic name of this enzyme class is 3,4-dihydroxyphenylacetate:oxygen 2,3-oxidoreductase (decyclizing). Other names in common use include 3,4-dihydroxyphenylacetic acid 2,3-dioxygenase, HPC dioxygenase, and homoprotocatechuate 2,3-dioxygenase. This enzyme participates in tyrosine metabolism. It employs one cofactor, iron.

== Structural studies ==
As of late 2007, eight structures have been solved for this class of enzymes, with PDB accession codes 1F1R, 1F1U, 1F1V, 1F1X, 1Q0C, 1Q0O, 2IG9, and 2IGA.
