= Glyoxalase system =

Biochemistry; detoxification enzyme system

The glyoxalase system is a set of enzymes that carry out the detoxification of methylglyoxal and the other reactive aldehydes that are produced as a normal part of metabolism. This system has been studied in both bacteria and eukaryotes. This detoxification is accomplished by the sequential action of two thiol-dependent enzymes; first, glyoxalase І catalyzes the isomerization of the spontaneously formed hemithioacetal adduct between glutathione and 2-oxoaldehydes (such as methylglyoxal) into S-2-hydroxyacylglutathione. Subsequently, glyoxalase ІІ hydrolyses these thioesters and in the case of methylglyoxal catabolism, produces D-lactate and GSH from S-D-lactoyl-glutathione.

This system shows many of the typical features of the enzymes that dispose of endogenous toxins. However, in contrast to the amazing substrate range of many of the enzymes involved in xenobiotic metabolism, it shows a narrow substrate specificity. Intracellular thiols are required as part of its enzymatic mechanism and the system acts to recycle reactive metabolites back to a form which may be useful to cellular metabolism.

== Overview of Glyoxalase Pathway ==
The glyoxalase system includes glyoxalase I (GLO1), glyoxalase II (GLO2), and reduced glutathione (GSH). In bacteria, there is an additional enzyme known as glyoxalase III (GLO3), that can function in the absence of GSH. GLO3 has not been found in humans yet. The system pathway begins with methylglyoxal (MG), which is produced from non-enzymatic reactions with DHAP or G3P produced in glycolysis. Methylglyoxal is then converted into S-d-lactoylglutathione by enzyme GLO1 with a catalytic amount of GSH, of which is hydrolyzed into non-toxic D-lactate via GLO2, with liberation of GSH that can be consumed by GLO1 with a new molecule of MG. D-lactate ultimately goes on to be metabolized into pyruvate.

== Regulation ==
Several small molecule inducers that can activate the glyoxalase pathway by either by promoting GLO1 activity to increase conversion of MG into D-Lactate (GLO1 activators), or by directly reducing MG levels or levels of MG substrate (MG scavengers). GLO1 activators include the synthetic drug candesartan or natural compounds resveratrol, fisetin, the binary combination of trans-resveratrol and hesperetin (tRES-HESP), mangiferin, allyl isothiocyanate, phenethyl isothiocyanate, sulforaphane, and bardoxolone methyl, and MG scavengers including aminoguanidine, alagebrium, and benfotiamine. There is also the small molecule pyridoxamine, which acts as both a GLO1 activator and MG scavenger.

Many inhibitors of GLO1 have been discovered since GLO1 activity tends to be promoted in cancer cells, thus GLO1 serves as a potential therapeutic target for anti-cancer drug treatment and has been the focus of many research studies regarding its regulation in tumor cells.

== Medical Applications/Pharmacology ==
Hyperglycemia, a side effect caused by diabetes, combines with oxidative stress to create advanced glycation end-products (AGEs) that can lead to diabetic retinopathy (DR), age related macular degeneration (AMD) and cataracts.

Enhancing the glyoxalase system has been shown to delay accumulation of AGEs and associated retinal damage in animals that consume higher glycemic index diets. This was corroborated upon over-expression of GLO1, which in C. elegans reduced basal MG concentration, prevented mitochondrial protein modification and enhanced lifespan. Similarly, in mice, GLO1 over-expression reduced baseline MG concentrations in the brain. In diabetic mice, it prevented diabetes-induced increases in MG modification of glomerular proteins, reduced oxidative stress, and prevented development of diabetic kidney pathology, despite unchanged levels of hyperglycemia. Western diets, typically high in glycemic index, exacerbate AGE accumulation and amplify aging-related damage. Enhancing the glyoxalase system may offer a promising therapeutic strategy to prevent the onset and progression of AGEs-related diseases.

Oxidative stress can lead to worsening neurological diseases such as Alzheimer's, Parkinson's, and Autism Spectrum Disorder. Flavonoids, a type of antioxidant that combats oxidative stress in the body, has been found to help decrease the production of radical oxygen species (ROS) mostly by preventing the formation of free radicals, additionally they partially enhance the transcription of glyoxalase.

Retinal pigmented epithelial cells (RPE) and retina have among the highest glyoxalase activities in the body, however, glyoxalase activity is depressed upon aging. This is consistent with observed increases in AGEs associated with aging. Enhancing the glyoxalase system has been shown to delay accumulation of AGEs and associated retinal damage in animals that consume higher glycemic index diets.

== Major metabolic pathways converging on the glyoxalase cycle ==
Although the glyoxalase pathway is the main metabolic system that reduces methylglyoxal levels in the cell, other enzymes have also been found to convert methylglyoxal into non-AGE producing species. Specifically, 99% of MG is processed by glyoxalase metabolism, while less than 1% is metabolized into hydroxyacetone by aldo-keto reductases (AKRs) or into pyruvate by aldehyde dehydrogenases (ALDH). Other reactions have been found to produce MG that also feeds into the glyoxalase pathway. These reactions include catabolism of threonine and acetone, peroxidation of lipids, autoxidation of glucose, and degradation of glycated proteins.

== See also ==
- Antioxidant – Compound that inhibits the oxidation of other molecules
- Advanced glycation endproduct – Proteins or lipids chemically altered by sugar exposure
