= Imuracetam =

Names
- Preferred IUPAC name N,N′-Bis[(2-oxopyrrolidin-1-yl)methyl]urea
- Other names UCB-G218

Identifiers
CAS Number	67542-41-0
3D model (JSmol)	Interactive image
ChEMBL	ChEMBL2106342
ChemSpider	143327
PubChem CID	163319
UNII	972FNV35ZM
CompTox Dashboard (EPA)	DTXSID20217875
- InChI: InChI=1S/C11H18N4O3/c16-9-3-1-5-14(9)7-12-11(18)13-8-15-6-2-4-10(15)17/h1-8H2,(H2,12,13,18) Key: WMKONRFEZGAHTE-UHFFFAOYSA-N; InChI=1/C11H18N4O3/c16-9-3-1-5-14(9)7-12-11(18)13-8-15-6-2-4-10(15)17/h1-8H2,(H2,12,13,18) Key: WMKONRFEZGAHTE-UHFFFAOYAT
- SMILES: O=C(NCN1C(=O)CCC1)NCN2C(=O)CCC2

Properties
Chemical formula	C_{11}H_{18}N_{4}O_{3}
Molar mass	254.290 g·mol^{−1}
Melting point	184.5 °C (364.1 °F; 457.6 K)
- Except where otherwise noted, data are given for materials in their standard state (at 25 °C [77 °F], 100 kPa). verify (what is ?) Infobox references

Imuracetam (INN; developmental code name UCB-G218) is a drug of the racetam group described as a nootropic (cognitive enhancer). It was under development in the 1970s but was never marketed.
