= Argpyrimidine =

Names
- IUPAC name (2S)-2-Amino-5-[(5-hydroxy-4,6-dimethylpyrimidin-2-yl)amino]pentanoic acid

Identifiers
| CAS Number | 195143-52-3 |
| 3D model (JSmol) | Interactive image |
| Beilstein Reference | 8853749 |
| ChEBI | CHEBI:59962 |
| ChemSpider | 20581619 |
| PubChem CID | 17750123 |
| CompTox Dashboard (EPA) | DTXSID00590274 |
- InChI: InChI=1S/C11H18N4O3/c1-6-9(16)7(2)15-11(14-6)13-5-3-4-8(12)10(17)18/h8,16H,3-5,12H2,1-2H3,(H,17,18)(H,13,14,15) Key: DCPBQSFZQHFSMR-UHFFFAOYSA-N
- SMILES: CC1=C(C(=NC(=N1)NCCC[C@@H](C(=O)O)N)C)O

Properties
| Chemical formula | C_{11}H_{18}N_{4}O_{3} |
| Molar mass | 254.290 g·mol^{−1} |
- Except where otherwise noted, data are given for materials in their standard state (at 25 °C [77 °F], 100 kPa). Infobox references

Argpyrimidine is an organic compound with the chemical formula C_{11}H_{18}N_{4}O_{3}. It is an advanced glycation end-product formed from arginine and methylglyoxal through the Maillard reaction. Argpyrimidine has been studied for its food chemistry purposes and its potential involvement in aging diseases and diabetes mellitus.

== Synthesis ==
=== Endogenous ===
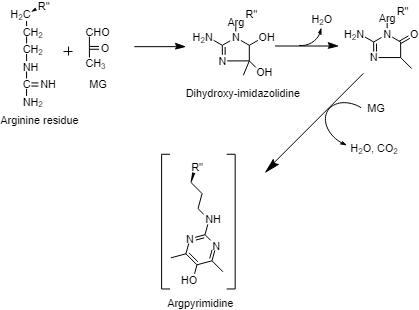
Maillard reaction of argpyrimidine under physiological conditions.

In vivo, argpyrimidine is synthesized from a Methylglyoxal (MG) mediated modification on an arginine residue in a protein. Methylglyoxal is formed through the Polyol pathway, the degradation of triose phosphates from Glycolysis, acetone metabolism, protein Glycation, or Lipid peroxidation. Methylglyoxal then can modify Arginine, Cysteine, or Lysine amino acid residues within a protein. The modification of these side chains through the Maillard reaction forms Advanced glycation end-products (AGEs). This occurs when there is an increase in blood sugar levels in the body. The free sugar compounds undergo alternate pathways, like advanced glycation, to produce AGEs. In the Methylglyoxal-mediated Maillard Reaction on arginine, a dihydroxy-imidazolidine intermediate is involved in the production of the argpyrimidine modification.

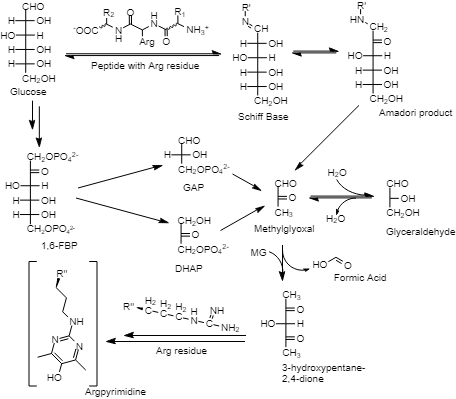
The pathways involved in the synthesis of methylglyoxal, and subsequent production of argpyrimidine.

=== Exogenous ===
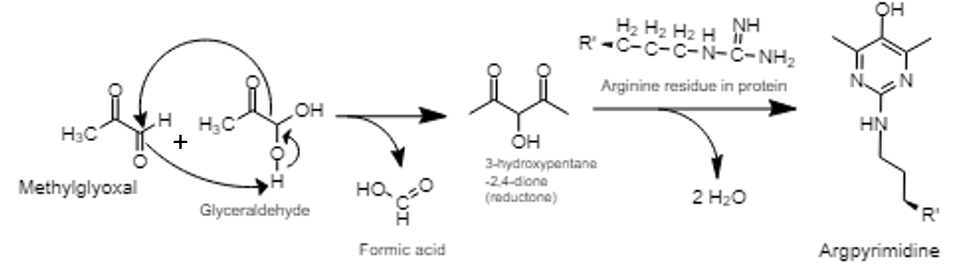
Mechanism of reductone intermediate formation from methylglyoxal in vitro. Two methylglyoxals undergo a Cannizzaro-like reaction initially to generate one methylglyoxal and one glyceraldehyde, then generate formic acid as a by-product through an intermolecular rearrangement.

In vitro, argpyrimidine has been synthesized through incubation with methylglyoxal and other higher sugars at physiological conditions. In synthesis through other sugars, argpyrimidine was produced in lower concentrations with glyceraldehyde, threose, ribose, ascorbic acids, and glucose and fructose, respectively. The argpyrimidine derivative produced through the MG-incubation with N^{α}-t-BOC-Arg (N-alpha-(tertbutoxycarbonyl)-L-Arginine), an alpha-amine protected amino acid derivative, in vitro used a reductone intermediate, 3-hydroxypentane-2,4-dione. This argpyrimidine product was found to be detectable by its blue fluorescent properties.

Argpyrimidine is also found in food chemistry through the browning of food by the Maillard Reaction. During this process, Glycation occurs, adding carbohydrate modifications to proteins and lipids. By adding the sugar components to the food, there is an added/changed element to the flavor of the food. This reaction is involved in the formation of most yeast containing foods, including breads and fermented alcohols.

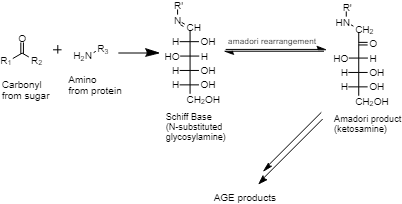
General outline of the Maillard Reaction.

The Maillard Reaction occurs between the carbonyl group of a sugar and the amino group on a protein. These react to form a N-substituted glycosylamine, also known as a Schiff base. The Schiff Base then undergoes an isomerization by an Amadori rearrangement to form a ketosamine, or an Amadori rearrangement. The Amadori product can then undergo many further reactions to form various AGE products, which can also be further modified into different products.

== Disease Research ==
=== Diabetes Mellitus ===
Argpyrimidine has been associated with Diabetes mellitus because of its relationship with Hyperglycemia in the body. Increased blood sugar is characteristic of Diabetes. During times of high concentration of sugar in the blood, the glucose-derivative methylglyoxal can be synthesized as an alternate pathway to glycolysis. This then allows for the AGEs, like argpyrimidine, to be produced. There have been studies that have linked the increase in AGEs to the characteristics of various diseases, including Diabetes, cardiovascular disease, and neurodegeneration. Because of this, there has been increasing research regarding argpyrimidine's role in diabetes related injury.

=== Aging ===
Similar to its association with Diabetes, argpyrimidine is also a known biomarker for aging. Through glycation of certain proteins, Microglia and Macrophages are activated in the brain, leading to aging related diseases, such as Alzheimer's disease. This glycation due to increase in AGEs has also been linked to a release of Cytokines, and to the increase of Oxidative stress, which increases oxidative damage to DNA, proteins, and other macromolecules in the body. The effects of the protein glycation is due to the interaction between the AGEs and their receptors on cell surfaces. Antioxidants have been shown to slow the process of aging and age related diseases by disrupting the interaction between AGEs and their receptors.

== See also ==
- N(6)-Carboxymethyllysine
