= Lactaldehyde =

Skeletal formula
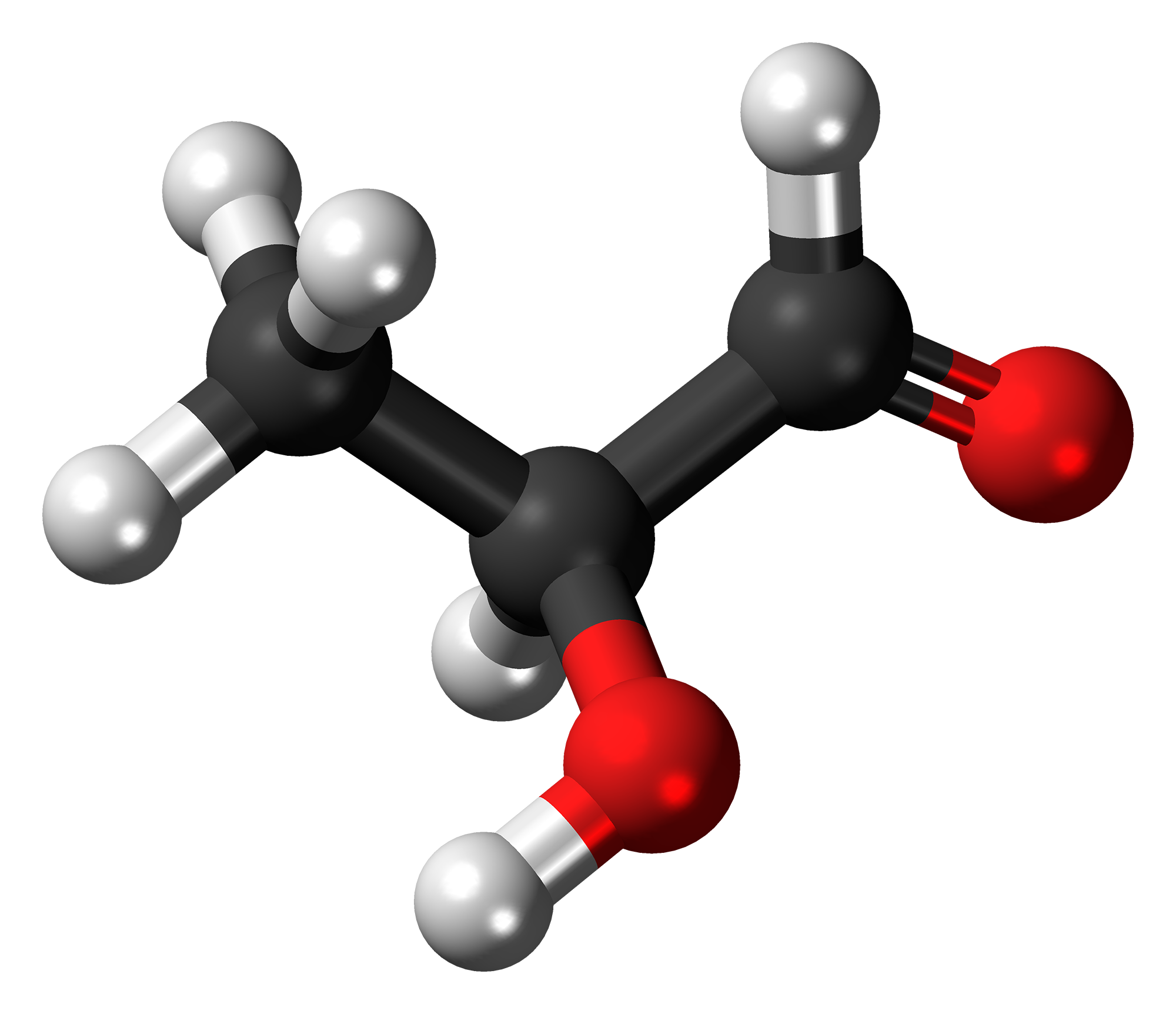
Ball-and-stick model of L-lactaldehyde

Names
- IUPAC name 2-Hydroxypropanal
- Other names Hydroxypropionaldehyde

Identifiers
| CAS Number | 598-35-6; 3946-09-6 (R); 3913-64-2 (S) |
| 3D model (JSmol) | Interactive image |
| ChEBI | CHEBI:18419 |
| ChemSpider | 832 |
| ECHA InfoCard | 100.237.284 |
| KEGG | C05999 |
| PubChem CID | 855 |
| UNII | S468FB0QE4 |
| CompTox Dashboard (EPA) | DTXSID60862267 |
- InChI: InChI=1S/C3H6O2/c1-3(5)2-4/h2-3,5H,1H3 Key: BSABBBMNWQWLLU-UHFFFAOYSA-N; InChI=1/C3H6O2/c1-3(5)2-4/h2-3,5H,1H3 Key: BSABBBMNWQWLLU-UHFFFAOYAY
- SMILES: O=CC(O)C

Properties
| Chemical formula | C_{3}H_{6}O_{2} |
| Molar mass | 74.079 g·mol^{−1} |

Related compounds
| Related aldehydes | Glycolaldehyde 3-Hydroxybutanal |
- Except where otherwise noted, data are given for materials in their standard state (at 25 °C [77 °F], 100 kPa). verify (what is ?) Infobox references

Lactaldehyde is an intermediate in the methylglyoxal metabolic pathway. Methylglyoxal is converted to D-lactaldehyde by glycerol dehydrogenase (gldA). Lactaldehyde is then oxidized to lactic acid by aldehyde dehydrogenase.

== Structure ==
Lactaldehyde is a three-carbon atom species with a carbonyl group on the first carbon atom (making it an aldehyde), and a hydroxy group on the second carbon atom, making it a secondary alcohol. The molecule is chiral, its stereocenter being located on the second carbon atom.

Lactaldehyde exists in several forms: in open-chain form and as cyclic hemiacetal; in solution and in crystal forms; as monomer and as dimer. In crystal form, three conformers occur as hemiacetal dimers with a 1,4-dioxane ring skeleton:

Dimerization of lactaldehyde leads to a mixture of stereoisomeric 1,4-dioxanes.

In equilibrium solution, negligibly small amounts of the monomer and at least one five-membered ring dimer exist.
