= Hydroxyacylglutathione hydrolase =

Identifiers
- EC no.: 3.1.2.6

Databases
- IntEnz: IntEnz view
- BRENDA: BRENDA entry
- ExPASy: NiceZyme view
- KEGG: KEGG entry
- MetaCyc: metabolic pathway
- PRIAM: profile
- PDB structures: RCSB PDB PDBe PDBsum
Search
- PMC: articles
- PubMed: articles
- NCBI: proteins

The enzyme hydroxyacylglutathione hydrolase (EC 3.1.2.6, systematic name = S-(2-hydroxyacyl)glutathione hydrolase) catalyzes the following reaction:

S-(2-hydroxyacyl)glutathione + H_{2}O = glutathione + a 2-hydroxy carboxylate

This enzyme belongs to the family of hydrolases, specifically the class of thioester lyases. It is commonly known as glyoxalase II. It participates in pyruvate metabolism.
