= Methylglyoxal =

Skeletal formula
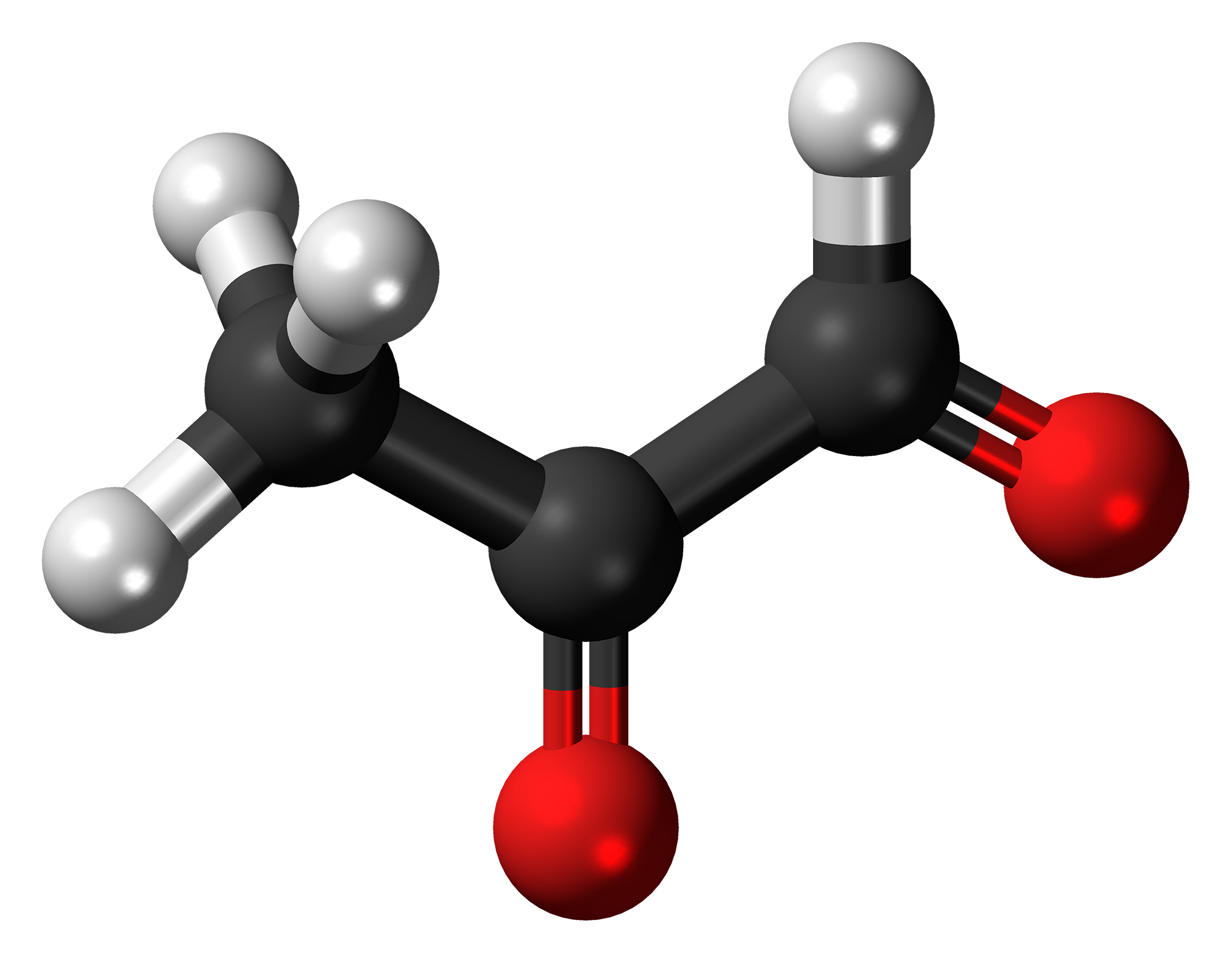

Names
- Preferred IUPAC name 2-Oxopropanal
- Other names Pyruvaldehyde

Identifiers
CAS Number	78-98-8; 1186-47-6 (hydrate)
3D model (JSmol)	Interactive image
Beilstein Reference	906750
ChEBI	CHEBI:17158
ChEMBL	ChEMBL170721
ChemSpider	857
DrugBank	DB03587
ECHA InfoCard	100.001.059
IUPHAR/BPS	6303
KEGG	C00546
MeSH	Methylglyoxal
PubChem CID	880
UNII	722KLD7415
CompTox Dashboard (EPA)	DTXSID0021628
- InChI: InChI=1S/C3H4O2/c1-3(5)2-4/h2H,1H3 Key: AIJULSRZWUXGPQ-UHFFFAOYSA-N; InChI=1/C3H4O2/c1-3(5)2-4/h2H,1H3 Key: AIJULSRZWUXGPQ-UHFFFAOYAZ
- SMILES: CC(=O)C=O

Properties
Chemical formula	C_{3}H_{4}O_{2}
Molar mass	72.063 g·mol^{−1}
Appearance	Yellow liquid
Density	1.046 g/cm^{3}
Melting point	25 °C (77 °F; 298 K)
Boiling point	72 °C (162 °F; 345 K)

Hazards
- GHS labelling
Pictograms	(GHS05: Corrosive) (GHS06: Toxic) (GHS08: Health hazard)
Signal word	Danger
Hazard statements	H290, H302, H315, H317, H318, H319, H335, H341
Precautionary statements	P201, P202, P234, P261, P264, P270, P271, P272, P280, P281, P301+P312, P302+P352, P304+P340, P305+P351+P338, P308+P313, P310, P312, P321, P330, P332+P313, P333+P313, P337+P313, P362, P363, P390, P403+P233, P404, P405, P501

Related compounds
Related ketones, aldehydes	Glyoxal; Propionaldehyde; Propanedial; Acetone; Diacetyl; Acetylacetone
Related compounds	Glyoxylic acid; Pyruvic acid; Acetoacetic acid
- Except where otherwise noted, data are given for materials in their standard state (at 25 °C [77 °F], 100 kPa). verify (what is ?) Infobox references

Methylglyoxal (MGO) is the organic compound with the formula CH_{3}C(O)CHO. It is a reduced derivative of pyruvic acid. It is a reactive compound that is implicated in the biology of diabetes. Methylglyoxal is produced industrially by degradation of carbohydrates using overexpressed methylglyoxal synthase.

== Chemical structure ==
Gaseous methylglyoxal has two carbonyl groups: an aldehyde and a ketone. In the presence of water, it exists as hydrates and oligomers. The formation of these hydrates is indicative of the high reactivity of MGO, which is relevant to its biological behavior.

== Biochemistry ==
=== Biosynthesis and biodegradation ===
In organisms, methylglyoxal is formed as a side-product of several metabolic pathways. Methylglyoxal mainly arises as side products of glycolysis involving glyceraldehyde-3-phosphate and dihydroxyacetone phosphate. It is also thought to arise via the degradation of acetone and threonine. Illustrative of the myriad pathways to MGO, aristolochic acid caused 12-fold increase of methylglyoxal from 18 to 231 μg/mg of kidney protein in poisoned mice. It may form from 3-aminoacetone, which is an intermediate of threonine catabolism, as well as through lipid peroxidation. However, the most important source is glycolysis. Here, methylglyoxal arises from nonenzymatic phosphate elimination from glyceraldehyde phosphate and dihydroxyacetone phosphate (DHAP), two intermediates of glycolysis. This conversion is the basis of a potential biotechnological route to the commodity chemical 1,2-propanediol.

Since methylglyoxal is highly cytotoxic, several detoxification mechanisms have evolved. One of these is the glyoxalase system. Methylglyoxal is detoxified by glutathione. Glutathione reacts with methylglyoxal to give a hemithioacetal, which converted into S-D-lactoyl-glutathione by glyoxalase I. This thioester is hydrolyzed to D-lactate by glyoxalase II.

=== Biochemical function ===
Methylglyoxal is involved in the formation of advanced glycation end products (AGEs). In this process, methylglyoxal reacts with free amino groups of lysine and arginine and with thiol groups of cysteine forming AGEs. Argpyrimidine is one example. Histones are also heavily susceptible to modification by methylglyoxal and these modifications are elevated in breast cancer.

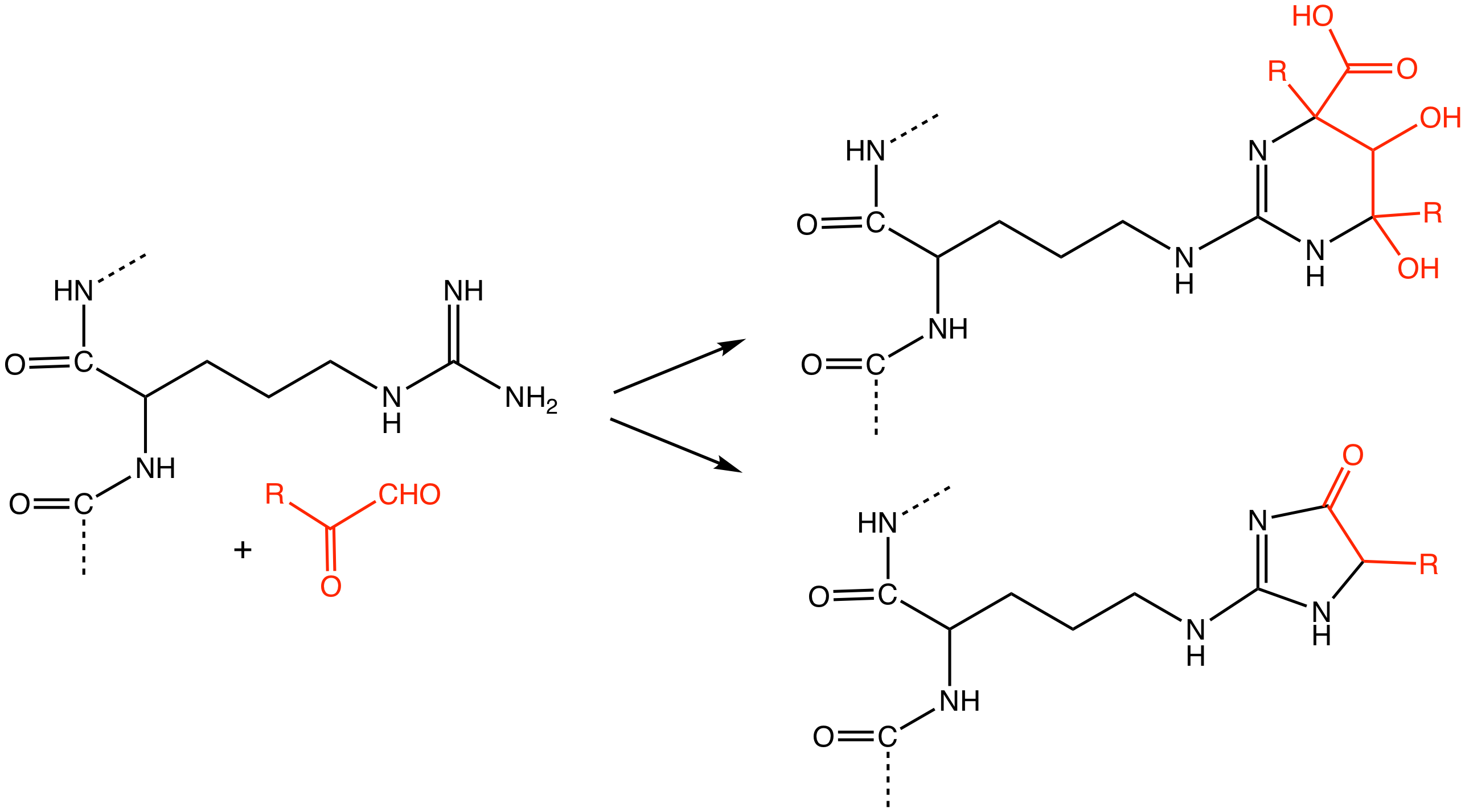
AGEs derived from the action of methylglyoxal on arginine.

DNA damages are induced by reactive carbonyls, principally methylglyoxal and glyoxal, at a frequency similar to that of oxidative DNA damages. Such damage, referred to as DNA glycation, can cause mutation, breaks in DNA and cytotoxicity. In humans, a protein DJ-1 (also named PARK7), has a key role in the repair of glycated DNA bases.

=== Biomedical aspects ===
Due to increased blood glucose levels, methylglyoxal has higher concentrations in diabetics and has been linked to arterial atherogenesis. Damage by methylglyoxal to low-density lipoprotein through glycation causes a fourfold increase of atherogenesis in diabetics. Methylglyoxal binds directly to the nerve endings and by that increases the chronic extremity soreness in diabetic neuropathy.

== Occurrence, other ==
Methylglyoxal is a component of some kinds of honey, including manuka honey; it appears to have activity against E. coli and S. aureus and may help prevent formation of biofilms formed by P. aeruginosa.

Research suggests that methylglyoxal contained in honey does not cause an increased formation of advanced glycation end products (AGEs) in healthy persons.

== See also ==
- Dicarbonyl
  - 1,2-Dicarbonyl, methylglyoxal can be classified as an 1,2-dicarbonyl
