= 2-Acetylpyridine =

Names
- Preferred IUPAC name 1-(Pyridin-2-yl)ethan-1-one
- Other names 1-(Pyridin-2-yl)ethanone; 1-(2-Pyridinyl)ethanone; Methyl 2-pyridyl ketone

Identifiers
CAS Number	1122-62-9
3D model (JSmol)	Interactive image
ChemSpider	13648
ECHA InfoCard	100.013.051
PubChem CID	14286
UNII	629O10UI3L
CompTox Dashboard (EPA)	DTXSID7024409
- SMILES: CC(C1=NC=CC=C1)=O

Properties
Chemical formula	C_{7}H_{7}NO
Molar mass	121.139 g·mol^{−1}
Density	1.08 g/mL
Melting point	8 to 10 °C (46 to 50 °F; 281 to 283 K)
Boiling point	188 to 189 °C (370 to 372 °F; 461 to 462 K)

Hazards
Flash point	73 °C (163 °F; 346 K)
- Except where otherwise noted, data are given for materials in their standard state (at 25 °C [77 °F], 100 kPa). Infobox references

2-Acetylpyridine is an organic compound with the formula CH_{3}COC_{5}H_{4}N. It is a viscous colorless liquid that is widely used as a flavoring substance. It is found in malt and produced by the Maillard reaction and by nixtamalization. It contributes to the flavor of corn tortillas, popcorn, and beer.

== Synthesis ==
The compound is prepared by acylation of 2-bromopyridine via the Grignard reagent.

== Chemical Use ==
- Synthesis of Doxylamine.

== See also ==
- 2-Acetyl-1-pyrroline
- 6-Acetyl-2,3,4,5-tetrahydropyridine
- Terpyridine
