= C7H7NO =

The molecular formula C_{7}H_{7}NO (molar mass: 121.14 g/mol, exact mass: 121.0528 u) may refer to:

- 2-Acetylpyridine
- 2-Aminobenzaldehyde
- Benzamide
- Formanilide
