= C9H10N2 =

The molecular formula C_{9}H_{10}N_{2} (molar mass: 146.19 g/mol, exact mass: 146.0844 u) may refer to:

- 5,6-Dimethylbenzimidazole
- Isomyosamine
- Myosmine
