= C15H11N3 =

The molecular formula C_{15}H_{11}N_{3} may refer to:

- Nicotelline
- Terpyridine
