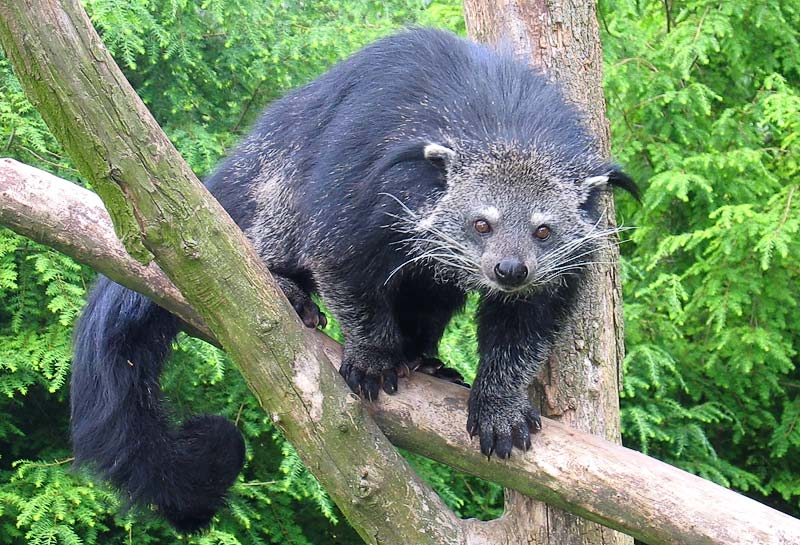
- In the Zoo Parc Overloon, the Netherlands

Conservation status
- Vulnerable (IUCN 3.1)
- CITES Appendix III

Scientific classification
- Kingdom: Animalia
- Phylum: Chordata
- Class: Mammalia
- Order: Carnivora
- Family: Viverridae
- Subfamily: Paradoxurinae
- Genus: Arctictis; Temminck, 1824
- Species: A. binturong

Binomial name
- Arctictis binturong (Raffles, 1822)
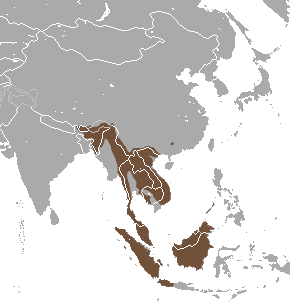
- Binturong range

= Binturong =

Asian mammal also known as a bearcat

The binturong (Arctictis binturong) (/bɪnˈtjʊərɒŋ, ˈbɪntjʊrɒŋ/; bin-TURE-ong, BIN-ture-ong), also known as the bearcat, is an arboreal viverrid native to South and Southeast Asia. It is the only species in the genus Arctictis, and it is divided into nine subspecies. It has long, thick hair, and is primarily dark in appearance, but can also have a whitish speckled pelage. It is unique in morphology with its popcorn-scented musk glands, and its long, bushy, prehensile tail.

The binturong is an omnivore, feeding on plants, insects, and smaller animals. It is primarily nocturnal, but also exhibits crepuscular behaviour. Females are able to enact delayed implantation, where a fertilized egg is not attached to the uterine walls until external conditions are ideal. The major threats to the binturong include habitat loss and forest degradation, as well as illegal hunting and trading. It has been assessed as Vulnerable on the IUCN Red List.

== Etymology ==
The scientific name Arctictis means 'bear-weasel', from the Greek arkt- "bear" and iktis "weasel". The name "binturong" is derived from the words běnturong and těnturun in Malay language. In the Western Malayo-Polynesian languages, the name can be attributed to two words, kitan meaning squirrel, and ma-tuRun meaning the one who descends.

== Taxonomy and evolution ==
Viverra binturong was the scientific name proposed by Thomas Stamford Raffles in 1822 for a specimen from Malacca, Malaysia. The generic name Arctictis was proposed by Coenraad Jacob Temminck in 1824.

Arctictis is a monotypic taxon, with nine distinct subspecies proposed:

- A. b. binturong (Raffles, 1821) occurs in Malaysia;
- A. b albifrons (Cuvier, 1822) was a specimen from northern Vietnam;
- A. b. whitei (Allen, 1910) was a specimen from Palawan islands;
- A. b. pageli (Schwarz, 1911) was collected in northern Borneo;
- A. b. gairdneri (Thomas, 1916) was a specimen from northern Thailand;
- A. b. niasensis (Lyon, 1916) was collected on Nias island;
- A. b. penicillatus (Pocock, 1933) occurs in Java;
- A. b. kerkhoveni (Sody, 1936) occurs on Bangka Island;
- A. b. menglaensis (Wang & Li, 1937) was a specimen from Yunnan province.

Arctictis is one of four genera found in the subfamily Paradoxurinae, a clade estimated to have genetically diverged 35.5 to 21.9 million years ago. Arctogalidia was the first genus that diverged around 21.9 million years ago, followed by Arctictis 15.9 million years ago, Paguma 10.7 million years ago, and Paradoxurus 7.1 million years ago.

Paradoxurinae phylogenetic tree:

- Paradoxurinae
  - - - Paradoxurus
        - - Paradoxurus zeylonensis (Golden palm civet)
          - Paradoxurus jerdoni (Jerdon's palm civet)
        - Paradoxurus hermaphroditus (Asian palm civet)
      - Paguma
        Paguma larvata (Masked palm civet)
    - Arctictis
      Arctictis binturong (Binturong)
  - Arctogalidia
    Arctogalidia trivirgata (Small-toothed palm civet)

The northern Indo-Chinese clade is separated from the southern Sundaic clade by the Isthmus of Kra. It was hypothesized that during the Pleistocene, the binturong was able to disperse along a land bridge connecting the two now-separated clade regions, and that gene flow between the two clades was blocked due to rising sea levels, leading to allopatric speciation. Three of the proposed subspecies are a part of the northern clade (A. b. albifrons, A. b. gairdneri, and A. b. menglaensis) while the other six are a part of the southern clade (A. b. binturong, A. b. whitei, A. b. pageli, A. b. niasensis, A. b. penicillatus, and A. b. kerkhoveni).

== Characteristics ==
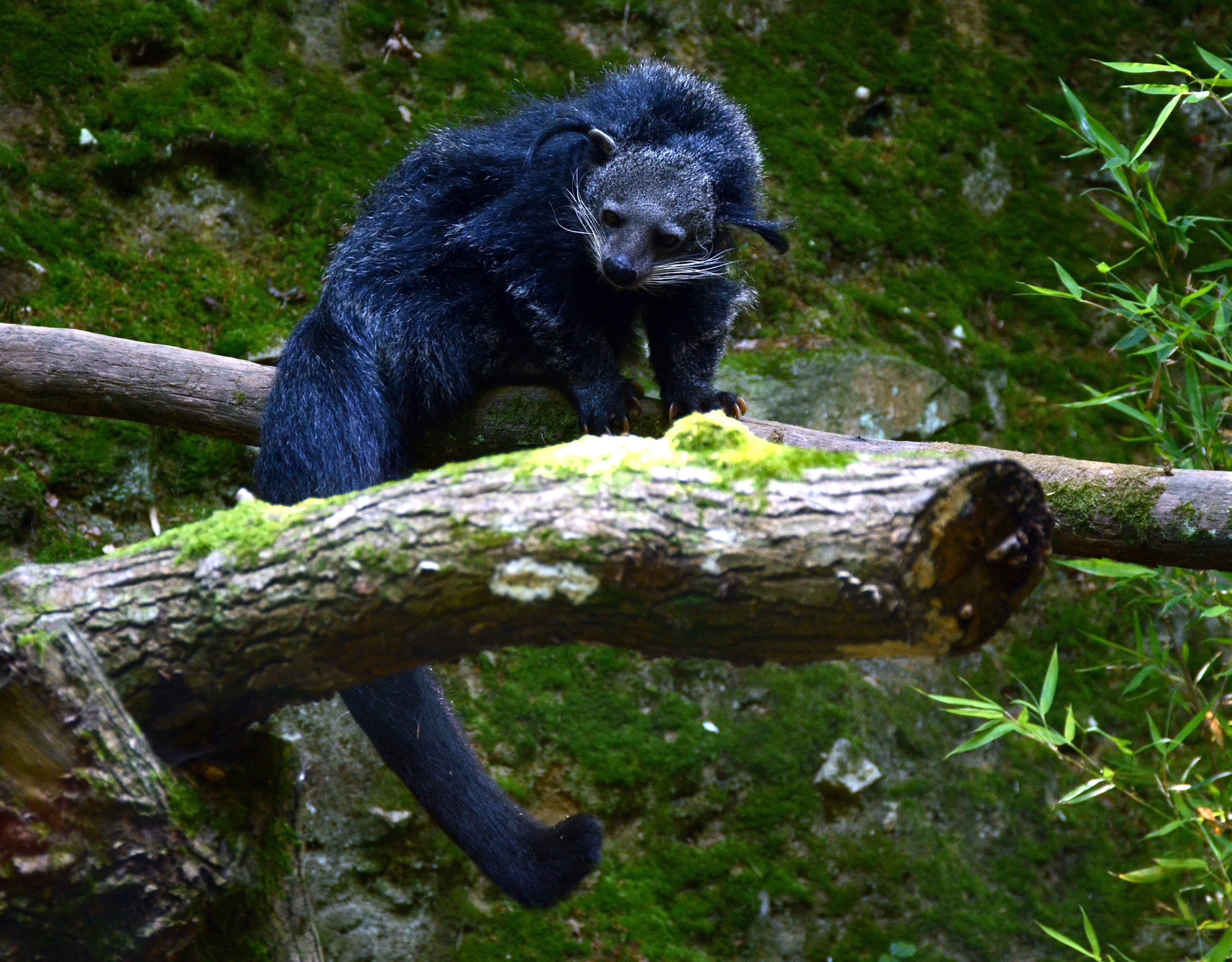
Binturong in zoo showing its prehensile tail

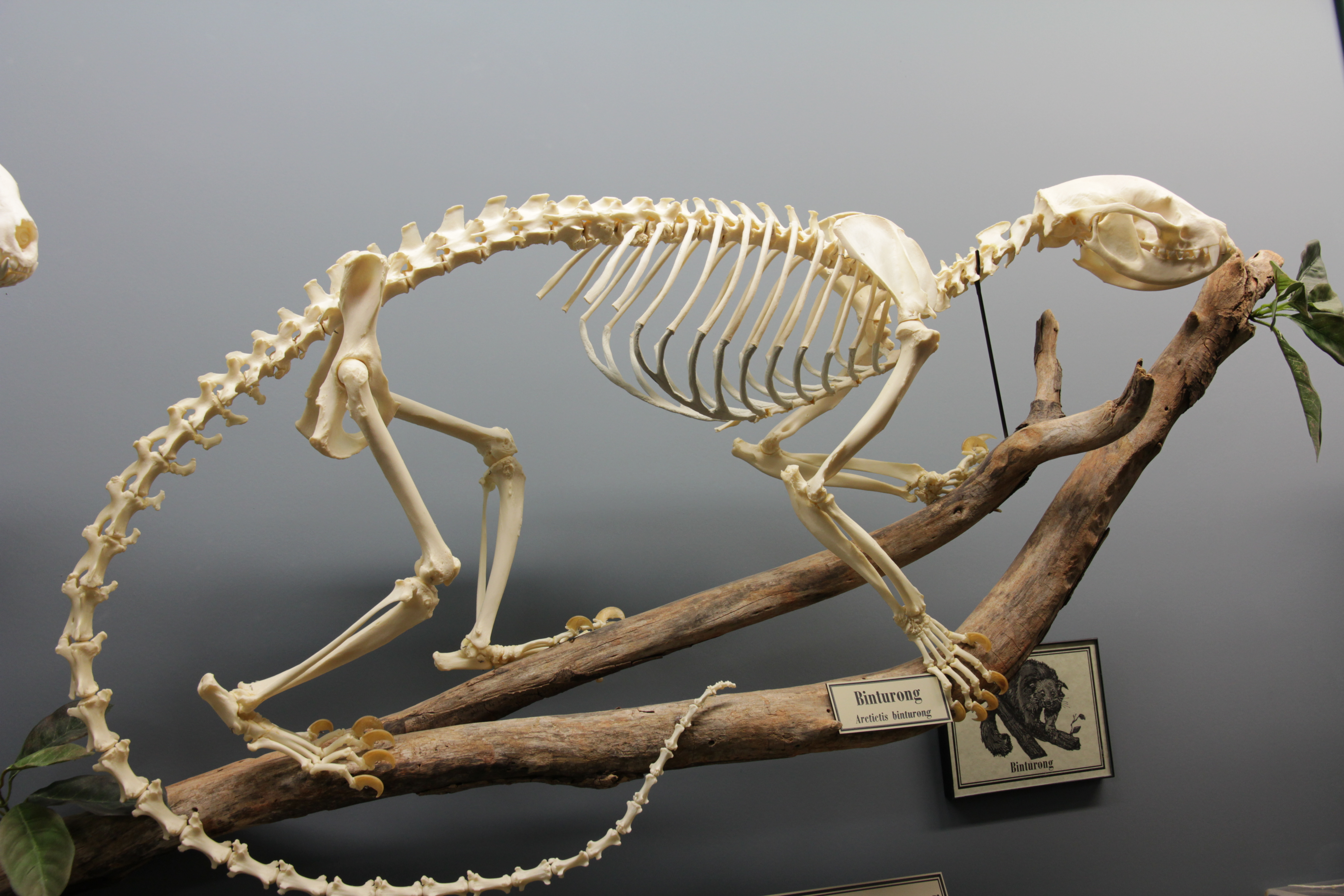
Binturong skeleton on display in the Museum of Osteology

The binturong has a thick coat of coarse black hair, a bushy, prehensile tail that is thick at the root, gradually tapering and curling inwards at the tip; it is highly adapted for an arboreal lifestyle with its long, heavy body and short, stout legs. The snout is short and pointed, with a slight upward curve at the nose; it is covered with brown, bristly hairs, which lengthen as they diverge, forming a peculiar radiated circle around the face. The eyes are large, black, and prominent; the ears are short and rounded, edged with white hair, and have noticeable black hair tufts. It has 36–40 teeth, and each quadrant typically contains three short, rounded incisors, a long, sharp canine tooth and six cheek teeth. Its limbs are plantigrade and bare soled, each sporting five clawed digits. Its third and fourth digits are syndactylous. The hindfeet are longer than the forefeet; the tail is nearly as long as the head and body. The body ranges from 71 to 84 cm (28 to 33 in) with the tail ranging from 66 to 69 cm (26 to 27 in) long. The binturong weighs around 9–20kg.

The binturong can be identified apart from other species in the Viverridae family by its syndactylous digits, short limbs, and the size of the rhinarium, which is more curved and narrow than other species. Unlike most other carnivorans, the male binturong does not have a baculum. The binturong also has longer, coarser coat hairs than other viverrids. The anterior bursa flap of the ears is more widely and less deeply emarginate. The base of the tail is more muscular, and is commonly paler in colour than the body. The body hairs are typically dark in base colour, but with varying levels of white or buff specklage, sometimes resulting in a straw-coloured or grey binturong. The young are often paler than the adults, but the head is always closely speckled with grey or buff. The long vibrissae are conspicuously white, and there is a white rim on the summit of the otherwise black ear. The glandular area is whitish.

Both sexes have scent glands; they are located on either side of the vulva in females, and between the scrotum and penis in males. Females are larger than males and dominant in their interactions; the musk glands emit an odor reminiscent of popcorn or corn chips, likely due to the volatile compound 2-acetyl-1-pyrroline in the urine, which is also produced in the Maillard reaction at high temperatures.

== Distribution and habitat ==
The binturong is distributed across South and Southeast Asia including India, Nepal, Bangladesh, Bhutan, Myanmar, Thailand, Malaysia, Laos, Cambodia, Vietnam, China, Indonesia, and the Philippines. It typically occurs at elevations of 0–3,000 m (0–9,843 ft), with primary and secondary lowland forests being more common.

In Assam, the binturong inhabits foothills or forested hills, but less the forested plains. In Laos, it has been observed in extensive evergreen forest. In Malaysia, it has been recorded in secondary forest surrounding a palm estate that was logged in the 1970s. In Palawan, it inhabits primary and secondary lowland forest, including grassland–forest mosaic up to 400 m (1,300 ft).

== Behavior and ecology ==
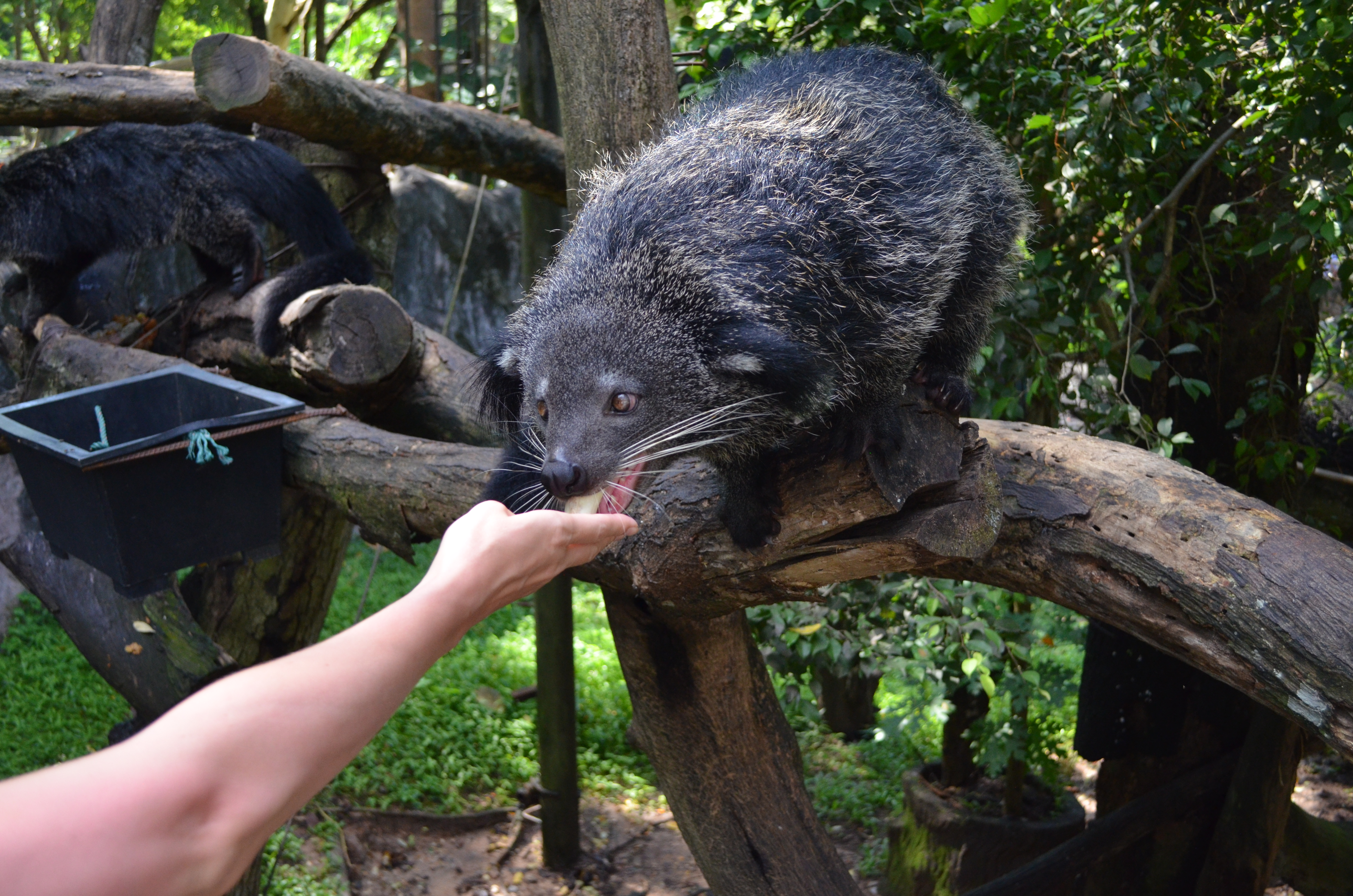
Captive binturong being fed

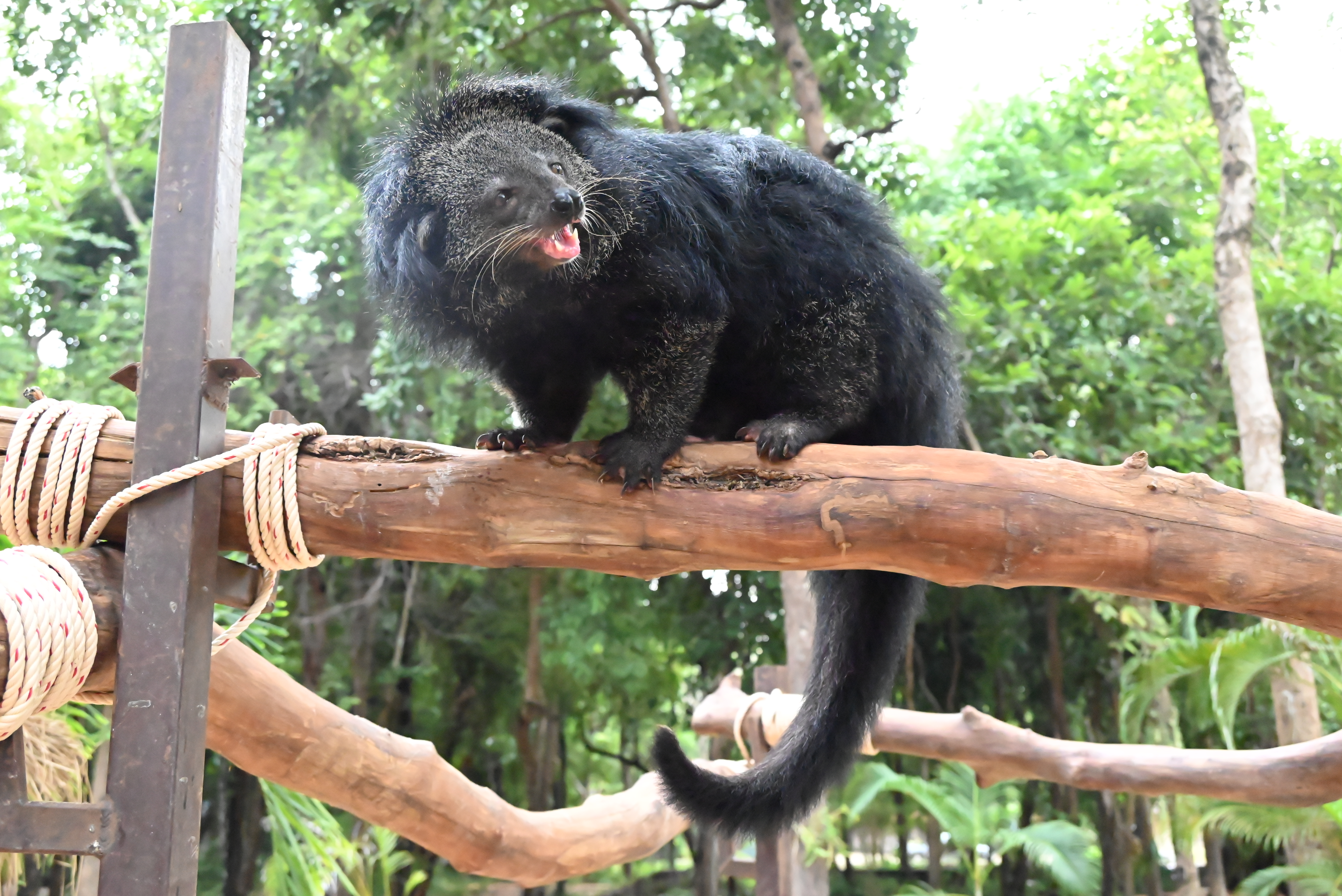
Captive binturong

The binturong is active during the day and at night. While binturongs have been sighted during the day in Pakke Tiger Reserve, other studies revealed binturong to be active during nights and early mornings. The binturong is likely to have to descend to the ground relatively frequently to move between trees.

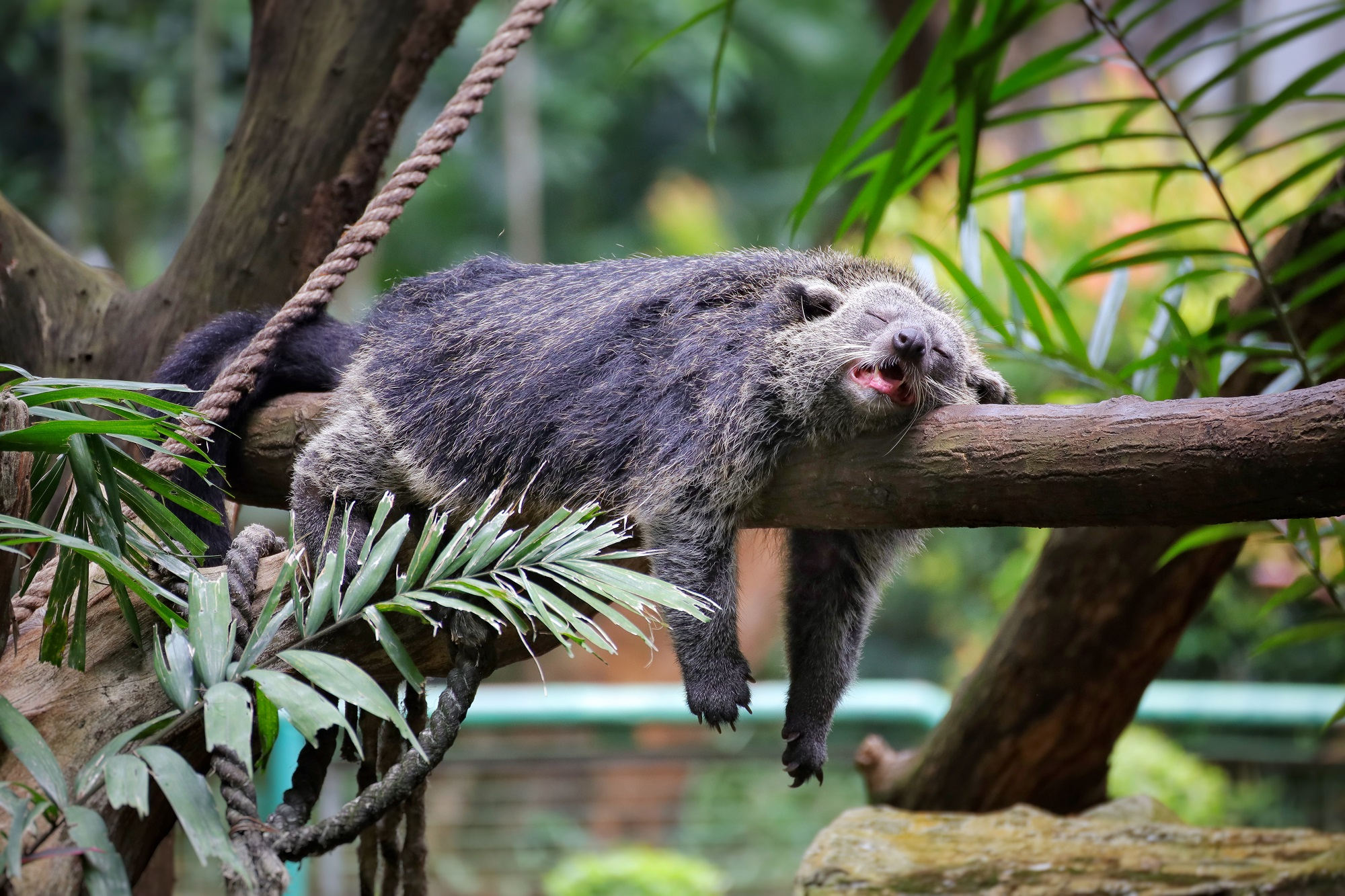
Binturong sleeping in captivity

Five radio-collared binturongs in the Phu Khieo Wildlife Sanctuary exhibited an arrhythmic activity dominated by crepuscular and nocturnal tendencies with peaks in the early morning and late evening. Reduced activity periods occurred from midday to late afternoon. They moved between 25 m (82 ft) and 2,698 m (8,852 ft) daily in the dry season and increased their daily movement to 4,143 m (13,593 ft) in the wet season. Range size of males varied between 0.9 and 6.1 km^{2} (0.35 and 2.36 sq mi). The average home range of a radio-collared female in the Khao Yai National Park was estimated at 4 km^{2} (1.5 sq mi), and the one of a male at 4.5 to 20.5 km^{2} (1.7 to 7.9 sq mi).

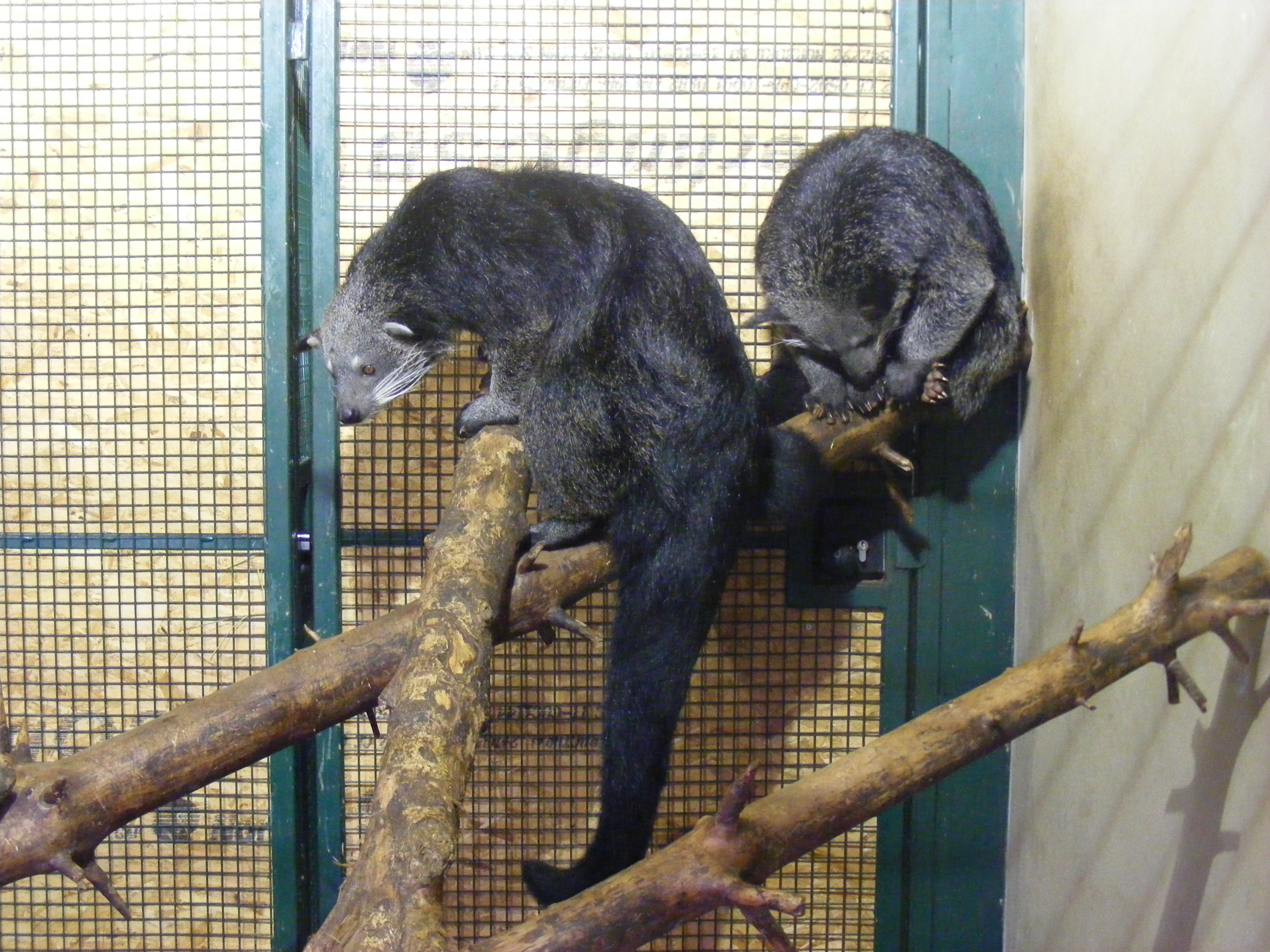
At Longleat Safari and Adventure Park in England

The binturong is essentially arboreal. Captive binturongs lay curled up with their heads tucked under their tails, seldom leaped, but climbed skillfully, albeit slowly, progressing with equal ease and confidence along the upper side of branches or upside down, beneath them, using the prehensile tail as a climbing and balance aid. They growl fiercely when irritated, and when on the prowl they periodically utter a series of low grunts or a hissing sound, made by expelling air through partially opened lips.

The binturong uses its tail to communicate. It moves about gently, clinging to a branch, often coming to a stop, and using its tail to keep balance. It shows a pronounced comfort behaviour through shaking its hair, grooming its fur, and scratching its body.

=== Diet ===
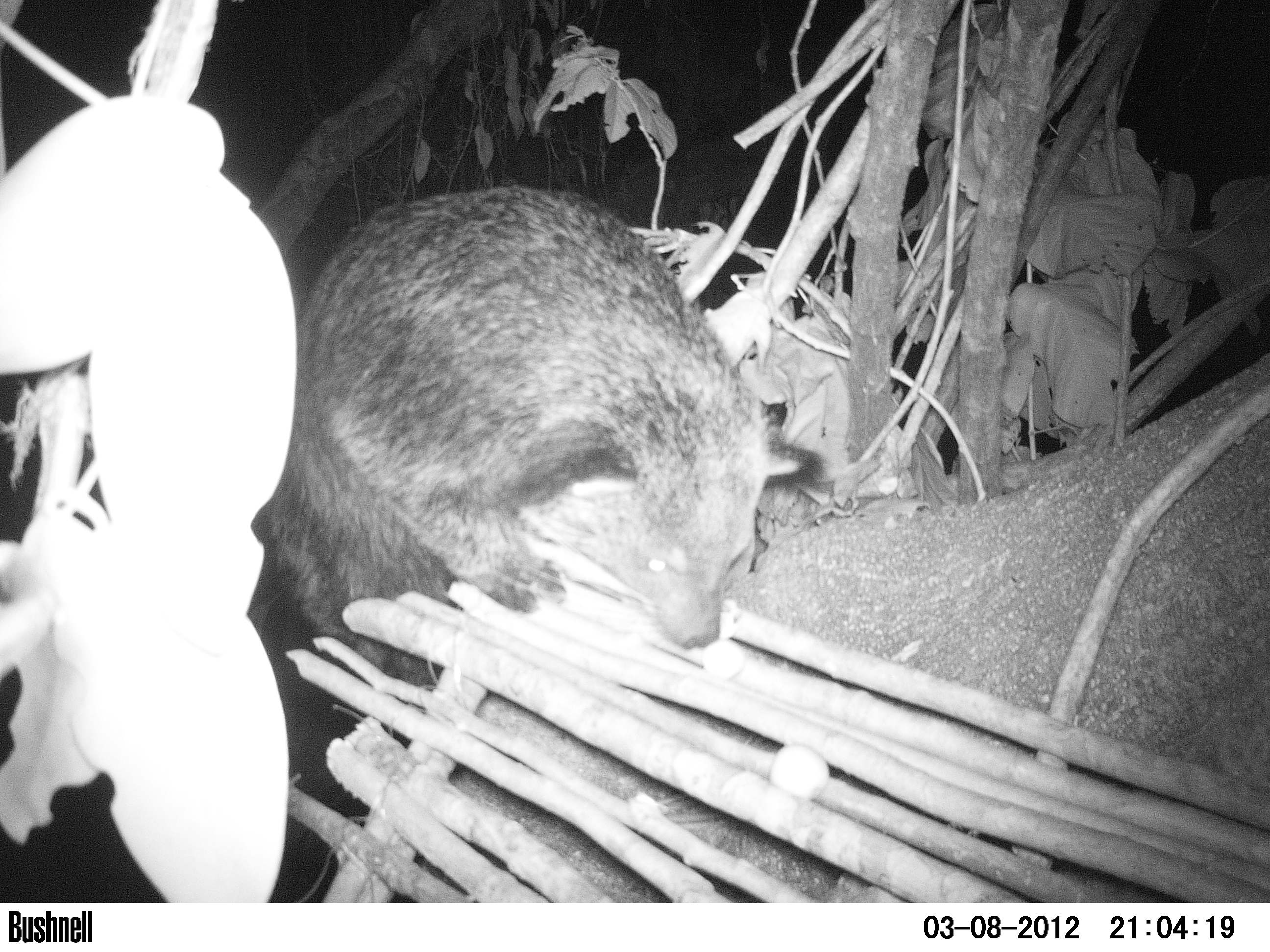
Binturong photographed by a camera trap at a feeding platform on a fruiting Ficus

The binturong is omnivorous, feeding on small mammals, rodents, birds, fish, earthworms, insects, and fruits. Figs are a major component of its diet. The binturong is considered to be a keystone species as they are very important dispersers of Ficus seeds, specifically strangler fig, because of their ability to scarify the seed's tough outer covering.

Fish and earthworms are likely unimportant items in its diet, as it is neither aquatic nor fossorial, coming across such prey only when opportunities present themselves. Since it does not have the attributes of a predatory mammal, it is likely that most of the binturong's diet is vegetable matter.

=== Scent marking ===
The binturong smells like hot, buttered popcorn because its urine contains 2-Acetyl-1-pyrroline (2-AP), which is the same chemical compound created when popcorn pops. The 2-AP "popcorn" chemical is concentrated in its urine, whereas the scent glands secrete a different, oily musk compound. When the binturong drag its tail over tree branches, it leaves a combination of both the oily, glandular musk, and the 2-AP laced urine; the sticky oils from the scent glands helps the urine adhere to the bark and last much longer in the humid rainforest canopy.

=== Predation and defensive adaptations ===
Binturongs are not known to be very susceptible to natural predators, but occasionally fall victim to tigers and dholes. Despite this fact, binturongs have a variety of defence mechanisms. The strong, pervasive 2-AP "popcorn" aroma warns other animals that they are entering the territory of a large, formidable animal, preventing accidental face-to-face confrontations. If cornered or severely agitated, a bearcat will defecate or urinate directly onto the threat. The overwhelming, concentrated odor acts as a highly effective psychological and chemical deterrent.

They emit a frightening array of auditory warning cues, including fierce growls, low grunts, hisses, cat-like screams, and deep howls to signal extreme aggression.

Despite eating mostly fruit, they possess the skull structure, sharp teeth, and high bite force of a true carnivore Its long, shaggy black fur is exceptionally dense and coarse, providing a layer of armor that makes it difficult for a predator to land a clean bite on its skin.

=== Reproduction ===
As a vulnerable species, many reproductive behaviours in binturong have been observed only in captivity. Copulation typically takes place within the tree canopy, once male and female binturongs reach around 30.4 and 27.7 months old respectively. They reproduce year-round, with gestation ranging 84 to 99 days in length, and the estrous cycle ranging 18 to 187 days. They remain fertile for 15 out of their 18-year lifespan. Their characteristic buttered popcorn scent is likely used for reproductive signalling, in addition to defense.

Interactions between male and female binturongs were found to be dependent on the female's ovulation cycle. During anestrus, or reproductive slowdown, females reduce interactions with males, while males act defensively in response. During estrus, or reproductive receptiveness, females increased their mate-calling activity and males were no longer defensive. Throughout copulation, female binturongs make a loud and coarse purring sound to signify successful reproductive receptivity between the mating pair.

Female binturongs can enact delayed implantation, which is a reproductive strategy that allows them to keep the fertilized egg from attaching to the walls of their uterus. This helps binturongs maximize the likelihood of successful reproduction. The pair can mate when the opportunity arises, and complete the cycle when environmental conditions are ideal, ensuring food availability and favourable temperatures. This is a particularly beneficial reproductive strategy, as it helps increase mating events in an otherwise isolated species without the risk of completing gestation under precarious environments. When implantation is successful, gestation occurs. Successful births observed in captivity result in litter sizes that vary from one to six young, with an average of two young per birth. The newborn babies (binlets), weighing between 280 and 340 g, are altricial, requiring maternal care until they are fully developed.

== Threats ==
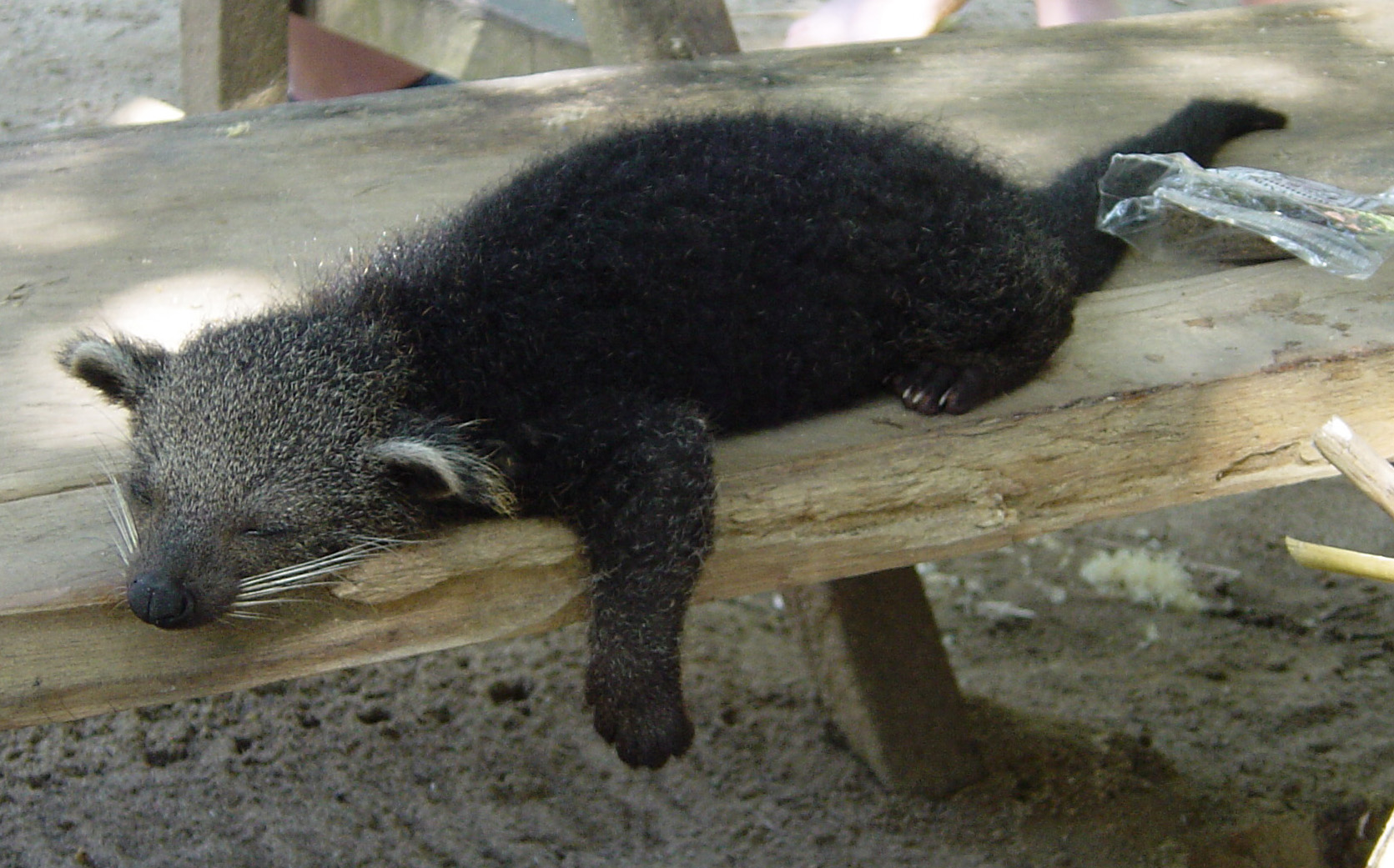
Young binturong kept as a pet by Orang Asli at Taman Negara, Malaysia

The binturong faces several threats, the major one being forest degradation through logging and conversion into plantations. Habitat loss has been especially severe in the lowlands of the Sundaic part of its range, showing no signs of slowing down. The binturong can persist in degraded and fragmented forests, but available data indicate that these may entail increased hunting pressure.

In Southeast Asia, the binturong is threatened by hunting, illegal pet trade, and use in kopi luwak production. It is hunted for meat and skins, which are used as food and in traditional medicine, and juveniles are also captured for trade.

== Conservation ==
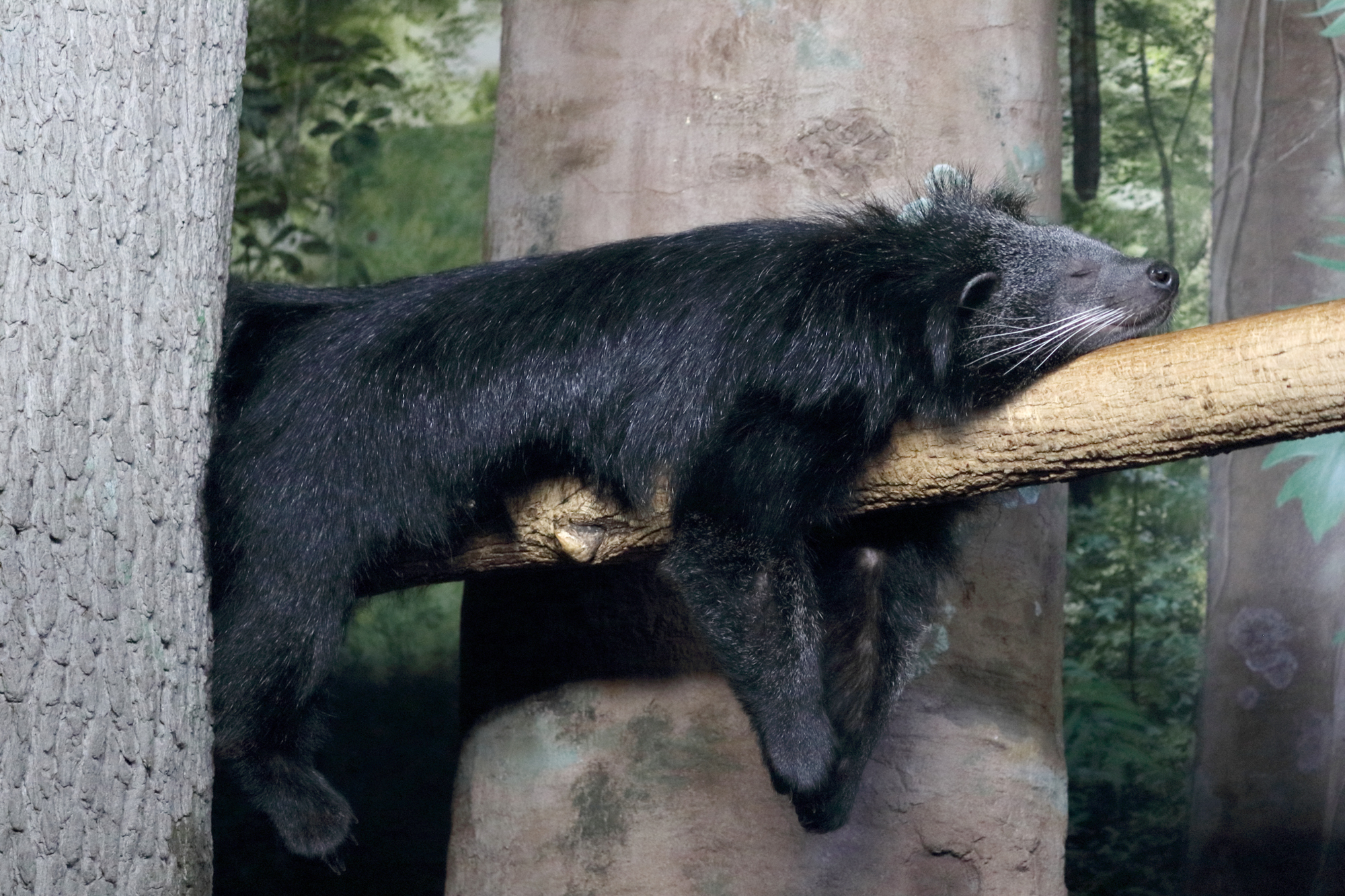
Captive binturong at the Cincinnati Zoo

The binturong is listed under CITES Appendix III, which means that it is protected in at least one country, and requires collaboration from CITES countries to uphold regulations for international trade.

Ex situ conservation aims to conserve genetic diversity by capturing binturong, breeding them, and releasing them back into the wild; however, a major problem is the lack of information on genetic origin or mistakes in pedigree tracking, which can lead to accidental hybridization or inbreeding. In 2006, a study assessing captive-bred binturong populations found low genetic diversity.

ABConservation spearheaded an in-situ conservation project in 2016 called the Bearcat Study Program located on Palawan Island, where binturongs are monitored and findings used to build on binturong research.
