= C4H10N2 =

The molecular formula C_{4}H_{10}N_{2} may refer to:

- Diazinane
  - Piperazine
  - Hexahydropyrimidine
  - Hexahydropyridazine
- Azoethane
- Diaminocyclobutanes
