= NPEPPS =

Protein-coding gene in the species Homo sapiens

Identifiers
- Aliases: NPEPPS, AAP-S, MP100, PSA, aminopeptidase puromycin sensitive
- External IDs: OMIM: 606793; MGI: 1101358; GeneCards: NPEPPS
Enzyme activity
EC #	BRENDA	ExPASy	KEGG	MetaCyc
3.4.11.14	↗	↗	↗	↗

Gene location (Human)
Chr.	Chromosome 17 (human)
Band	17q21.32	Start	47,522,942 bp
Band	17q21.32	End	47,624,665 bp

Gene location (Mouse)
Chr.	Chromosome 11 (mouse)
Band	11 D|11 60.95 cM	Start	97,096,668 bp
Band	11 D|11 60.95 cM	End	97,171,464 bp
RNA expression pattern
Bgee	Human / Mouse (ortholog); Top expressed in: right hemisphere of cerebellum; vagina; epithelium of colon; ganglionic eminence; skin of leg; gastric mucosa; muscle of thigh; skin of abdomen; left ovary; right ovary / Top expressed in: Rostral migratory stream; neural layer of retina; retinal pigment epithelium; ciliary body; facial motor nucleus; granulocyte; supraoptic nucleus; dentate gyrus of hippocampal formation granule cell; nucleus of stria terminalis; anterior horn of spinal cord; More reference expression data
BioGPS	n/a
Gene ontology
Molecular function	peptide binding; zinc ion binding; peptidase activity; metalloaminopeptidase activity; metallopeptidase activity; hydrolase activity; metal ion binding; aminopeptidase activity
Cellular component	extracellular exosome; nucleus; cytosol; cytoplasm
Biological process	protein polyubiquitination; cellular response to hypoxia; positive regulation of protein targeting to mitochondrion; peptide catabolic process; proteolysis
Sources:Amigo / QuickGO
Orthologs
Databases	NCBI: entry; OMA: entry
Species	Human	Mouse
Entrez	9520	19155
Ensembl	ENSG00000141279	ENSMUSG00000001441
UniProt	P55786	Q11011
RefSeq (mRNA)	NM_006310; NM_001330257	NM_008942
RefSeq (protein)	NP_001317186; NP_006301	NP_032968
Location (UCSC)	Chr 17: 47.52 – 47.62 Mb	Chr 11: 97.1 – 97.17 Mb
PubMed search
- Wikidata
View/Edit Human	View/Edit Mouse

Puromycin-sensitive amino peptidase also known as cytosol alanyl aminopeptidase or alanine aminopeptidase (AAP-S) (EC 3.4.11.14) is an enzyme that in humans is encoded by the NPEPPS gene.

== Function ==
This gene encodes the puromycin-sensitive aminopeptidase, a zinc metallopeptidase which hydrolyzes amino acids from the N-terminus of its substrate. The protein has been localized to both the cytoplasm and to cellular membranes. This enzyme degrades enkephalins in the brain, and studies in mouse suggest that it is involved in proteolytic events regulating the cell cycle. It has been identified as a novel modifier of TAU-induced neurodegeneration with neuroprotective effects via direct proteolysis of TAU protein. The loss of NPEPPS function exacerbates neurodegeneration.

== Structure ==
=== Gene ===
The NPEPPS gene is located at chromosome 17q21, consisting of 25 exons and spanning 40 kb. NPEPPS segmental duplications form different fusion genes in different African great apes, for instance, NPEPPS-TBC1D3 in humans and NPEPPS-CCL4 in Pan.

=== Protein ===
NPEPPS is a ubiquitous, 100 kDa, Zn^{2+} metallopeptidase highly expressed in the brain. Two isozymes have been found and they are expressed differently in the nervous system. Glu 309 is one of the active site glutamates, and its mutation could convert the enzyme into an inactive binding protein.

== Function ==
NPEPPS has been proposed to function in a variety of processes, including metabolism of neuropeptidase, regulation of the cell cycle, and hydrolysis of proteasomal products to amino acids. NPEPPS is a major protease to digest SOD1, similar to its role in TAU-induced neurodegeneration. NPEPPS is also reported to play a role in creating and destroying MHC class I-presented peptides and in limiting MHC class I Ag presentation in dendritic cells.

== Clinical significance ==
NPEPPS is induced in neurons expressing mutant huntingtin and is critical in preventing the accumulation of polyglutamine in normal cells. It has been reported as the major peptidase digesting polyglutamine sequences in neurodegenerative diseases, such as Huntington's disease. It has been shown that elevation of NPEPPS activity in vivo could effectively block accumulation of hyperphosphorylated TAU protein and thus slow down the disease progression, suggesting increasing NPEPPS activity may be a feasible therapeutic approach to eliminate accumulation of toxic substrates, which are involved in neurodegenerative diseases.

== Interactions ==
- Cyclin-dependent kinase 5
- SOD1
- TAU
- Tetrahydropyridine
- β-amyloid
