= Pyrroline =

Class of chemical compounds

Pyrrolines, also known under the name dihydropyrroles, are three heterocyclic organic chemical compounds that differ in the position of the double bond. Pyrrolines are formally derived from the aromate pyrrole by hydrogenation. 1-Pyrroline is a cyclic imine, and 3-pyrroline is a symmetrical cyclic amine. 2-Pyrroline, an NH-containing enamine, is labile with respect to trimerization.

The three parent pyrrolines are colorless, volatile liquids.

Pyrroline Isomers
Property	1-Pyrroline	2-Pyrroline	3-Pyrroline
Structure			
CAS Registry Number	5724-81-2	638-31-3	109-96-6
PubChem CID	79803	94395	66059
Melting Point (°C)	—	—	−57
Boiling Point (°C)	87		90–91
Notable examples	1-pyrroline (parent); 1-pyrroline-5-carboxylic acid myosmine pyrrolysine 2-acetyl-1-pyrroline	2-acetyl-2-pyrroline	3-pyrroline (parent)

N-substituted pyrrolines can be generated by ring-closing metathesis.

== See also ==
- Pyrrole, the aromatic analog with two double bonds
- Pyrrolidine, the fully saturated analog without double bonds
- Indoles and isoindoles, pyrrolines fused to a benzene ring
