= Tetrahydropyridine =

Heterocycles

- Three isomers of tetrahydropyridine

Identifiers
CAS Number	2,3,4,5: 505-18-0; 1,2,3,4: 37497-65-7; 1,2,3,6: 694-05-3
3D model (JSmol)	2,3,4,5: Interactive image; 1,2,3,4: Interactive image; 1,2,3,6: Interactive image
ChEBI	CHEBI:26145; 2,3,4,5: CHEBI:47858; 1,2,3,4: CHEBI:47859; 1,2,3,6: CHEBI:47860
ChemSpider	2,3,4,5: 61469; 1,2,3,4: 8351589; 1,2,3,6: 12226
EC Number	1,2,3,6: 211-766-2
KEGG	2,3,4,5: C06181
PubChem CID	2,3,4,5: 68161; 1,2,3,4: 10176084; 1,2,3,6: 12750
UNII	1,2,3,6: 26RLS9D255
UN number	2410
CompTox Dashboard (EPA)	2,3,4,5: DTXSID20198514; 1,2,3,4: DTXSID40436364; 1,2,3,6: DTXSID0075289
- InChI: 2,3,4,5: InChI=1S/C5H9N/c1-2-4-6-5-3-1/h4H,1-3,5H2 Key: DWKUKQRKVCMOLP-UHFFFAOYSA-N; 1,2,3,4: InChI=1S/C5H9N/c1-2-4-6-5-3-1/h2,4,6H,1,3,5H2 Key: VSWICNJIUPRZIK-UHFFFAOYSA-N; 1,2,3,6: InChI=1S/C5H9N/c1-2-4-6-5-3-1/h1-2,6H,3-5H2 Key: FTAHXMZRJCZXDL-UHFFFAOYSA-N
- SMILES: 2,3,4,5: C1CCN=CC1; 1,2,3,4: C1CC=CNC1; 1,2,3,6: C1CNCC=C1

Properties
Chemical formula	C_{5}H_{9}N
Molar mass	83.134 g·mol^{−1}
- Except where otherwise noted, data are given for materials in their standard state (at 25 °C [77 °F], 100 kPa). Infobox references

Tetrahydropyridines (or piperideines) are heterocycles with the formula C_{5}H_{9}N. Three isomers exist, which differ by the location of the double bond. None of the parent species occur widely, so they are mainly of theoretical interest. Although the parent tetrahydropyridines are rare, many substituted tetrahydropyridines are known.

== Preparation and occurrence ==
1-Methyl-4-phenyl-1,2,3,6-tetrahydropyridine causes permanent symptoms of Parkinson's disease.

(–)-Mitragynine is a naturally occurring tetrahydropyridine.

2,3,4,5-tetrahydropyridine, a colorless liquid, is commercially available. It is an imine and readily trimerizes, forming the hexahydro-1,3,5-triazine and fused hexahydro-1,3-diazine derivatives α-, β-, and iso- tripiperideine.

6-acetyl-2,3,4,5-tetrahydropyridine contributes to the flavor of baked goods such as bread.

== N-Alkyl derivatives ==
While true tetrahydropyridine are rare, N-alkyl derivatives are more common. Partial reduction of pyridinium salts gives N-alkyltetrahydropyridines. Treatment of N-methylpyridinium salts with borohydride reagents gives 1-methyl-1,2,3,6-tetrahydropyridine.

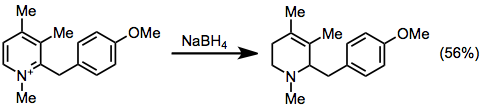

A modified Ireland-Claisen rearrangement leads to tetrahydropyridines via a silyl ketene acetal intermediate.

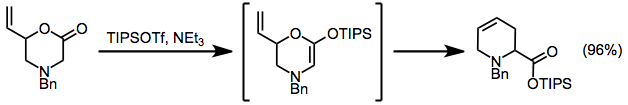

Ring-closing olefin metathesis has also been used to establish the tetrahydropyridine ring system.
