= Triazinane =

Class of nitrogen-containing heterocycles

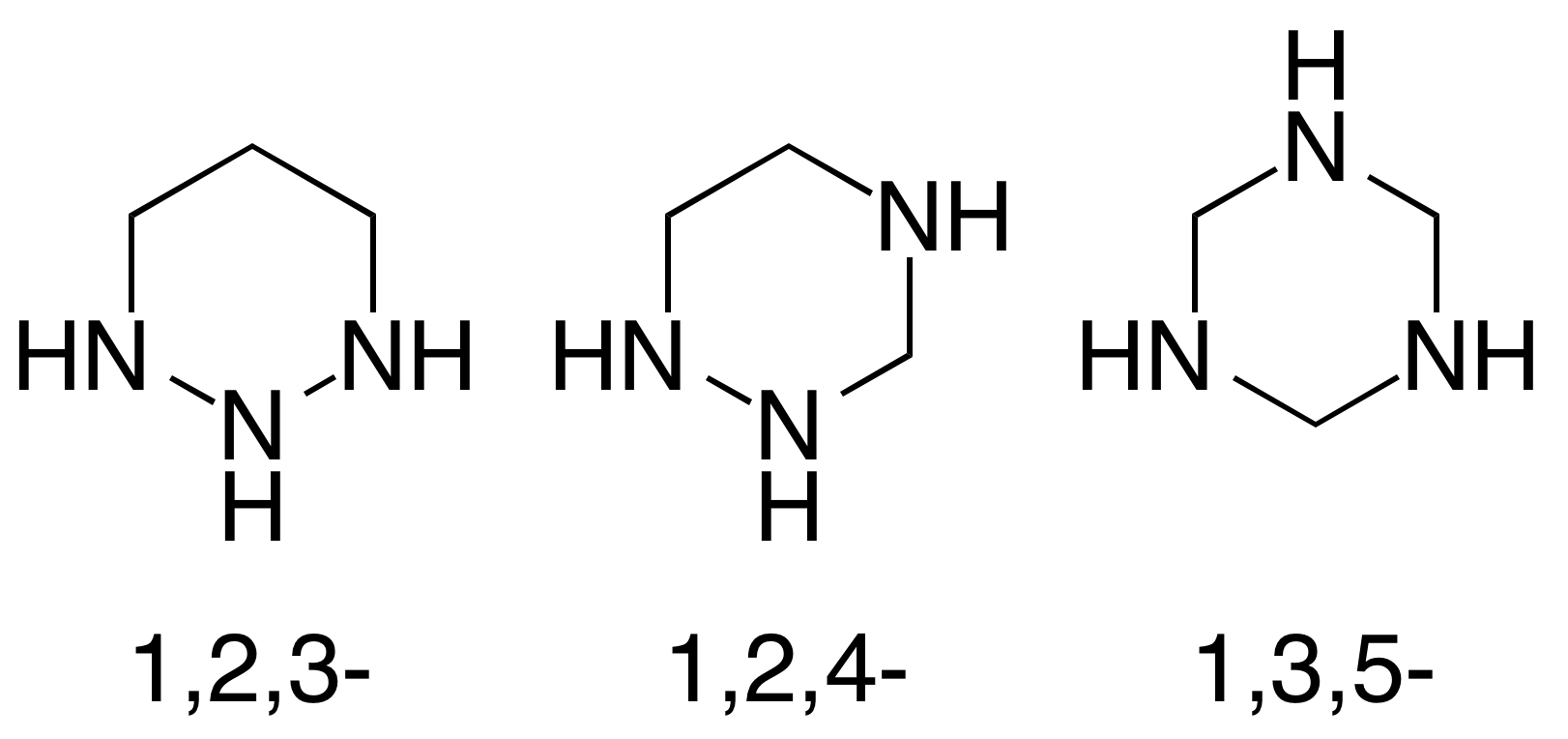

Identifiers
CAS Number	1,2,4: 942593-11-5; 1,3,5: 110-90-7
3D model (JSmol)	1,2,3: Interactive image; 1,2,4: Interactive image; 1,3,5: Interactive image
Beilstein Reference	8477997
ChEBI	1,2,3: CHEBI:38040; 1,2,4: CHEBI:38041
ChemSpider	1,2,3: 10613003; 1,2,4: 11359397; 1,3,5: 60330
PubChem CID	1,2,3: 16048634; 1,2,4: 16048633; 1,3,5: 66971
UNII	M9XXT26VWH
- InChI: 1,2,3: InChI=1S/C3H9N3/c1-2-4-6-5-3-1/h4-6H,1-3H2 Key: OYWRDHBGMCXGFY-UHFFFAOYSA-N; 1,2,4: InChI=1S/C3H9N3/c1-2-5-6-3-4-1/h4-6H,1-3H2 Key: VWKKSBDTNICZRS-UHFFFAOYSA-N; 1,3,5: InChI=1S/C3H9N3/c1-4-2-6-3-5-1/h4-6H,1-3H2 Key: LKLLNYWECKEQIB-UHFFFAOYSA-N
- SMILES: 1,2,3: C1CNNNC1; 1,2,4: C1CNNCN1; 1,3,5: C1NCNCN1

Properties
Chemical formula	C_{3}H_{9}N_{3}
Molar mass	87.126 g·mol^{−1}
- Except where otherwise noted, data are given for materials in their standard state (at 25 °C [77 °F], 100 kPa). Infobox references

Triazinanes are a class of nitrogen-containing heterocycles. Triazinanes have six-membered cyclohexane-like ring but with three carbon centers replaced by nitrogen. The parent have the molecular formula (CH_{2})_{3}(NH)_{3}. Three isomeric forms are possible, but only 1,3,5-triazinanes are common. 1,3,5-triazinane is a labile intermediate in the formation of hexamethylenetetramine from ammonia and formaldehyde.

Stable 1,3,5-Triorganotriazines are formed by condensation of primary amines and formaldehyde.

== See also ==
- 6-membered rings with one nitrogen atom: Piperidine
- 6-membered rings with two nitrogen atoms: Diazinane
- Triazine
- Borazine (borazole)
- Triazenes, organic compound with the formula RN=N−NR^{2}
