= Louis Camille Maillard =

French physician and chemist

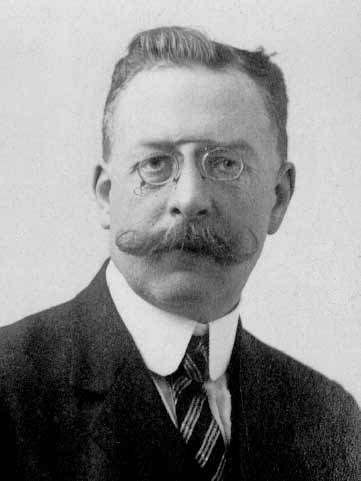
- French chemist and physician
- Born: 4 February 1878; Pont-à-Mousson, France
- Died: 12 May 1936 (aged 58); Paris, France
- Known for: Maillard reaction

Louis Camille Maillard (/maɪˈjɑːr/ my-YAR; French: [lwi kamij majaʁ]; 4 February 1878 – 12 May 1936) was a French physician and chemist. He made important contributions to the study of kidney disorders. He also became known for the "Maillard reaction", the chemical reaction which he described in 1912, by which amino acids and sugars react in foods via contact with fats, giving a browned, flavorful surface to everything from bread and seared steaks to toasted marshmallows.

== Early life ==
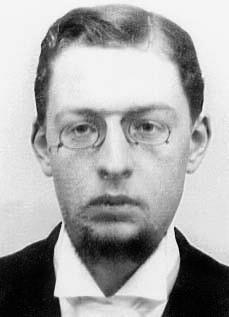
Portrait of professor Louis Maillard in his youth in 1903

Louis Camille Maillard was born on 4 February 1878 in Pont-à-Mousson, France. Maillard obtained his Masters of Science in Nancy in 1897 and his Doctor of Medicine in 1903. He then worked in the Chemical Division of the School of Medicine at the University of Nancy. On 6 June 1910, Maillard married Jeanne Louise Faisans.

In 1914, he moved to Paris where he worked as head of the biological group in the Chemical Laboratory at the University of Paris. In 1919 he was appointed as a professor of biological and medical chemistry at the University of Algiers Division of Pharmacy, Academy of Medicine.

== Scientific contributions ==
In Paris, his work on physiology, in particular the metabolism of urea and kidney illnesses, led him to introduce new theories about "urogenic imperfection" and the concept of the "coefficient of Maillard" or "index of ureogenic imperfection." His ideas proved very useful in the diagnosis of kidney disorders. In 1912, he undertook studies of the reaction between amino acids and sugars. This work is considered one of his major contributions, and the Maillard reaction was named after him. For this variety of work he received several awards including the French Academy of Medicine award in 1914.

== Final years ==
Maillard enrolled in the French army during the First World War, but his health was adversely affected. After the war, Maillard abruptly left Paris in 1919 to occupy a position with the Department of Pharmacy at the Faculty of Medicine Sciences in Algiers (Algeria). During this time, he ceased practically all research.

He died suddenly on 12 May 1936, in Paris, while judging a competition for a fellowship.

== Honors ==
Maillard was named a Chevalier of the Legion of Honour on 30 July 1916, by the Minister of War. At the time, he was a Physician Major, First Class, in the Reserve of the 11th Army Corps Health Service. This provisional title was removed on 24 December 1920, by the General Treasury of Algiers, in exchange for a final pension savings booklet.
