= (Terpyridine)ruthenium trichloride =

Identifiers
CAS Number	72905-30-7
3D model (JSmol)	Interactive image
ChemSpider	9179899
PubChem CID	11004708
- InChI: InChI=1S/C15H11N3.3ClH.Ru/c1-3-10-16-12(6-1)14-8-5-9-15(18-14)13-7-2-4-11-17-13;;;;/h1-11H;3*1H;/q;;;;+3/p-3 Key: YDKDTFLOHRMCRP-UHFFFAOYSA-K
- SMILES: Cl[Ru-3]23(Cl)(Cl)[n+]1ccccc1c([n+]12)cccc1c1cccc[n+]13

Properties
Chemical formula	C_{15}H_{11}Cl_{3}N_{3}Ru
Molar mass	440.69 g·mol^{−1}
Appearance	brown solid
Density	1.451 g/cm^{3}
Solubility in water	insoluble

Hazards
- GHS labelling
Signal word	Warning
- Except where otherwise noted, data are given for materials in their standard state (at 25 °C [77 °F], 100 kPa). Infobox references

(Terpyridine)ruthenium trichloride is the coordination complex with the formula RuCl_{3}(terpy), where terpy is terpyridine. It is a brown paramagnetic solid that is a precursor to other complexes of ruthenium, mainly by substitution of the chloride ligands. The complex has octahedral geometry. The synthesis of this complex was reported for the first time in 1980, it was prepared by mixing ruthenium trichloride and terpyridine in ethanol, heating the mixture to reflux conditions A later synthetic protocol uses a similar approach by heating ruthenium trichloride with a DMF solution of terpyridine.
