= Formanilide =

Names
- Preferred IUPAC name N-Phenylformamide
- Other names N-formylaniline, formylaniline, phenylformamide

Identifiers
CAS Number	103-70-8
3D model (JSmol)	Interactive image
ChEBI	CHEBI:42416
ChEMBL	ChEMBL1232659
ChemSpider	7388
ECHA InfoCard	100.002.851
EC Number	203-136-0
PubChem CID	7671
UNII	2805XEA9CL
CompTox Dashboard (EPA)	DTXSID3025338
- InChI: InChI=1S/C7H7NO/c9-6-8-7-4-2-1-3-5-7/h1-6H,(H,8,9) Key: DYDNPESBYVVLBO-UHFFFAOYSA-N
- SMILES: C1=CC=C(C=C1)NC=O

Properties
Chemical formula	C_{7}H_{7}NO
Molar mass	121.139 g·mol^{−1}
Appearance	colorless or white solid
Density	1.144 g/cm^{3}
Melting point	46.6–47.5 °C (115.9–117.5 °F; 319.8–320.6 K)
Boiling point	271 °C (520 °F; 544 K)

Hazards
- GHS labelling
Pictograms	(GHS07: Exclamation mark)
Signal word	Warning
Hazard statements	H302
Precautionary statements	P264, P270, P301+P312, P330, P501
- Except where otherwise noted, data are given for materials in their standard state (at 25 °C [77 °F], 100 kPa). Infobox references

Formanilide is the organic compound with the formula C_{6}H_{5}N(H)CHO. It is the formamide of aniline. It is a colorless solid. The compound is an additive in rubber products as well as a common synthetic intermediate. For example, it is a precursor to the fungicide mepanipyrim. Dehydration of formanilide gives phenylisocyanide.
