= Terpyridine =

Names
- Preferred IUPAC name 1^{2},2^{2}:2^{6},3^{2}-Terpyridine
- Other names 2,6-Bis(2-pyridyl)pyridine, Tripyridyl, 2,2′:6′,2″-Terpyridine

Identifiers
CAS Number	1148-79-4
3D model (JSmol)	Interactive image
ChEBI	CHEBI:245199
ChEMBL	ChEMBL89445
ChemSpider	64012
ECHA InfoCard	100.013.235
PubChem CID	70848
UNII	G5E357ISH5
CompTox Dashboard (EPA)	DTXSID2061567
- InChI: InChI=1S/C15H11N3/c1-3-10-16-12(6-1)14-8-5-9-15(18-14)13-7-2-4-11-17-13/h1-11H Key: DRGAZIDRYFYHIJ-UHFFFAOYSA-N; InChI=1/C15H11N3/c1-3-10-16-12(6-1)14-8-5-9-15(18-14)13-7-2-4-11-17-13/h1-11H Key: DRGAZIDRYFYHIJ-UHFFFAOYAP
- SMILES: c1ccnc(c1)c2cccc(n2)c3ccccn3

Properties
Chemical formula	C_{15}H_{11}N_{3}
Molar mass	233.274 g·mol^{−1}
Appearance	white solid
Melting point	88 °C (190 °F; 361 K)
Boiling point	370 °C (698 °F; 643 K)
- Except where otherwise noted, data are given for materials in their standard state (at 25 °C [77 °F], 100 kPa). verify (what is ?) Infobox references

Terpyridine (2,2';6',2"-terpyridine, often abbreviated to Terpy or Tpy) is a heterocyclic compound derived from pyridine. It is a white solid that is soluble in most organic solvents. The compound is mainly used as a ligand in coordination chemistry.

== Synthesis ==
Terpyridine was first synthesized by G. Morgan and F. H. Burstall in 1932 by the oxidative coupling of pyridines. This method, however, proceeded in low yields. More efficient syntheses have since been described, mainly starting from 2-acetylpyridine. One method produces an enaminone by the reaction of 2-acetylpyridine with N,N-dimethylformamide dimethyl acetal. The base-catalyzed reaction of 2-acetylpyridine with carbon disulfide followed by alkylation with methyl iodide gives C_{5}H_{4}NCOCH=C(SMe)_{2}. Condensation of this species with 2-acetylpyridine forms the related 1,5-diketone, which condenses with ammonium acetate to form a terpyridine. Treatment of this derivative with Raney nickel removes the thioether group.

Other methods have been developed for the synthesis of terpyridine and its substituted derivatives. Substituted terpyridines are also synthesized from palladium-catalyzed cross-coupling reactions. It can be prepared from bis-triazinyl pyridine.

== Properties ==
(Terpyridine)ruthenium trichloride is a representative complex of terpyridine.

Terpyridine is a tridentate ligand that binds metals at three meridional sites giving two adjacent 5-membered MN_{2}C_{2} chelate rings. Terpyridine forms complexes with most transition metal ion as do other polypyridine compounds, such as 2,2'-bipyridine and 1,10-phenanthroline. Complexes containing two terpyridine complexes, i.e. [M(Terpy)_{2}]^{n+} are common. They differ structurally from the related [M(Bipy)_{3}]^{n+} complexes in being achiral.

Terpyridine complexes, like other polypyridine complexes, exhibit characteristic optical and electrochemical properties: metal-to-ligand charge transfer (MLCT) in the visible region, reversible reduction and oxidation, and fairly intense luminescence.

Because they are pi-acceptors, terpyridine and bipyridine tend to stabilize metals in lower oxidation states. For instance in acetonitrile solution, it is possible to generate the [M(Terpy)_{2}]^{+} (M = Ni, Co).

== Related compounds ==
- bis-triazinyl pyridines are related to terpyridine in their binding to metals.
- quaterpyridine
- Nicotelline - isomer of terpyridine

== See also ==
- Chelating ligand
- Pincer ligand
- Terthiophene
- Terphenyl
