= Isomyosamine =

Chemical compound

Identifiers
CAS Number	53844-46-5
3D model (JSmol)	Interactive image
ChemSpider	9461533
PubChem CID	11286546
UNII	3A50Y1J4LP
CompTox Dashboard (EPA)	DTXSID80461155
- InChI: InChI=1S/C9H10N2/c1-3-8(7-10-5-1)9-4-2-6-11-9/h1,3,5-7,9H,2,4H2 Key: GXTVPHUMJMZDSF-UHFFFAOYSA-N
- SMILES: C1CC(N=C1)C2=CN=CC=C2

Properties
Chemical formula	C_{9}H_{10}N_{2}
Molar mass	146.193 g·mol^{−1}

Related compounds
Related compounds	Myosmine; Nicotine
- Except where otherwise noted, data are given for materials in their standard state (at 25 °C [77 °F], 100 kPa). Infobox references

Isomyosamine, also known as MyMD-1 or MYMD-1, is a synthetic derivative of tobacco plant alkaloids being developed as a metabolic- and immunomodulator by MyMD Pharmaceuticals. To date, isomyosamine has been shown to suppress the production of IFN-γ, IL-2, IL-10, and TNF-α, and decrease the severity of experimental thyroiditis in a murine model. Trials in humans are being planned, and some are underway, examining the potential benefits of isomyosamine in autoimmune diseases such as rheumatoid arthritis, and in sarcopenia and frailty.

MyMD Pharmaceuticals claim that MYMD-1 is not immunosuppressive, and thus should not be associated with the dangerous side effects such as infections that are seen in currently used TNF-α inhibitors such as adalimumab. While it is true that there currently is no evidence of immunosuppression in isomyosamine recipients, this has not yet been tested in large clinical trials.

== Scientific studies ==
=== Preclinical studies ===
One preliminary murine study comparing isomyosamine to rapamycin, the best-characterised drug slowing the progression of aging, reported an increase in lifespan in the isomyosamine cohort, indicating anti-aging activity. Isomyosamine's anti-proliferative effects were similar to those of rapamycin.

=== Clinical trials ===
A phase I randomised double-blind placebo-controlled trial on healthy volunteers examining the safety and pharmacokinetic properties of different amounts of isomyosamine found no serious adverse events, but 3 cases of mild dysgeusia in the highest-dose (600 mg) cohort. A preliminary decrease in TNF-α levels was reported in the lowest-dose (150 mg) cohort, but not in the placebo cohort.
