= Myosmine =

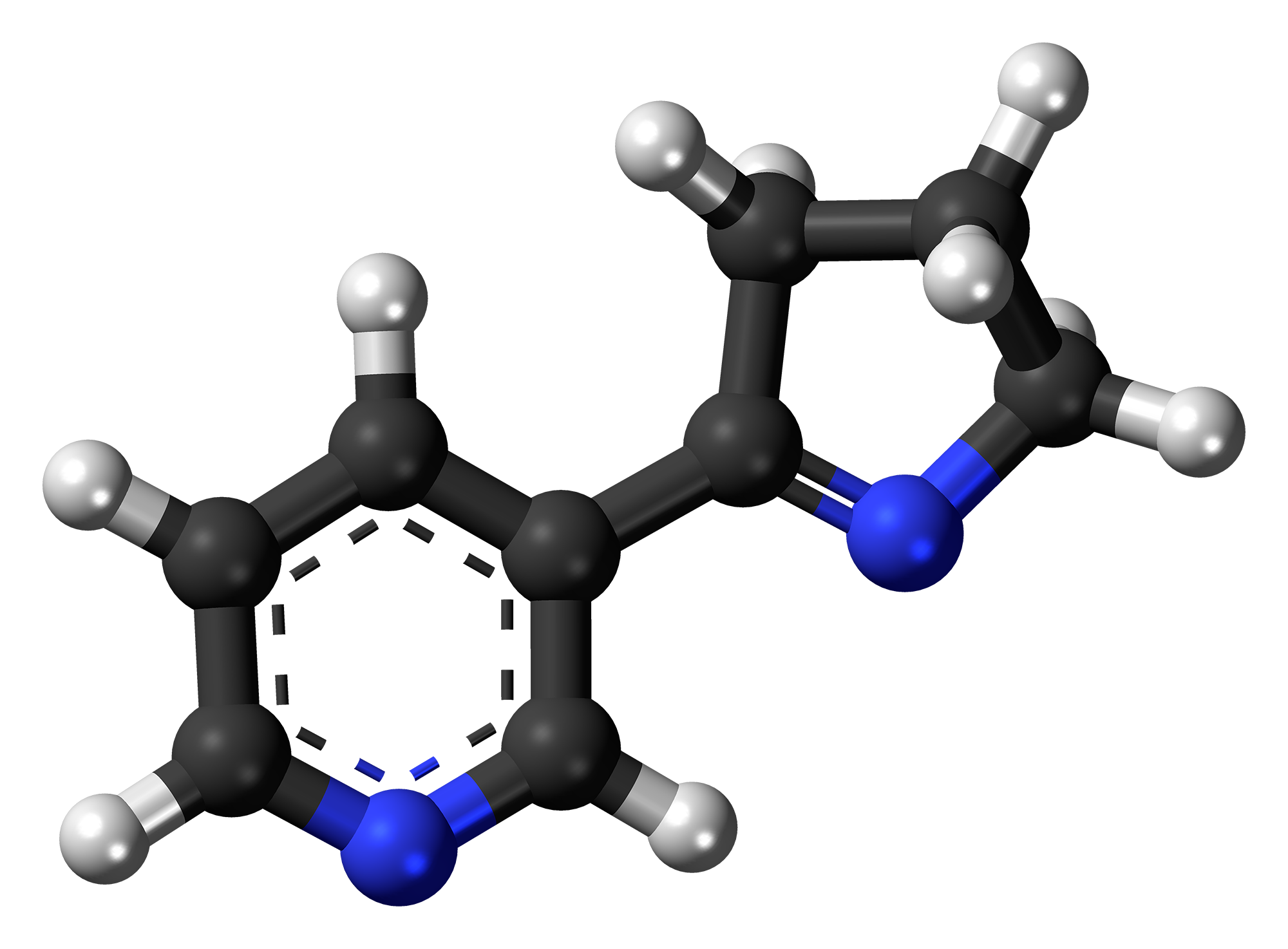

Names
- Preferred IUPAC name 3-(3,4-Dihydro-2H-pyrrol-5-yl)pyridine
- Other names 3-(1-Pyrrolin-2-yl)pyridine

Identifiers
CAS Number	532-12-7
3D model (JSmol)	Interactive image
ChEBI	CHEBI:7051
ChEMBL	ChEMBL423429
ChemSpider	391011
ECHA InfoCard	100.165.015
EC Number	637-297-7
KEGG	C10160
PubChem CID	442649
UNII	9O0A545W4L
CompTox Dashboard (EPA)	DTXSID70891866
- InChI: InChI=1S/C9H10N2/c1-3-8(7-10-5-1)9-4-2-6-11-9/h1,3,5,7H,2,4,6H2 Key: DPNGWXJMIILTBS-UHFFFAOYSA-N
- SMILES: n1cccc(c1)/C2=N/CCC2

Properties
Chemical formula	C_{9}H_{10}N_{2}
Molar mass	146.193 g·mol^{−1}
Appearance	colorless solid
Melting point	44 °C (111 °F; 317 K)
Boiling point	77 °C (171 °F; 350 K) 0.15 mm Hg

Hazards
- GHS labelling
Pictograms	(GHS07: Exclamation mark)
Signal word	Warning
Hazard statements	H302, H315, H319, H335
Precautionary statements	P261, P264, P264+P265, P270, P271, P280, P301+P317, P302+P352, P304+P340, P305+P351+P338, P319, P321, P330, P332+P317, P337+P317, P362+P364, P403+P233, P405, P501

Related compounds
Related compounds	Isomyosamine
- Except where otherwise noted, data are given for materials in their standard state (at 25 °C [77 °F], 100 kPa). Infobox references

Myosmine is an alkaloid with the formula NC_{5}H_{4}−C_{4}H_{6}N. It is structurally and biosynthetically related to nicotine, being also found in tobacco and several other plants. Chemically, it is closely related to nicotine. It inhibits aromatase sevenfold more potently than nicotine. It also releases dopamine in adult but not adolescent rats.

Myosmine is a precursor to nicotinic acid.

== Chemical synthesis ==
Myosmin can be prepared in the laboratory from 3-lithiopyridine via condensation with cyclobutanone to give the pyridyl-cyclobutanol. Reaction of the latter tertiary alcohol with hydrazoic acid under conditions for the Schmidt reaction gives myosmine. Reduction of the imine group in myosmin with sodium cyanoborohydride affords nornicotine.

== See also ==
- Catharanthine
- Nicotelline
- Pozanicline
- PHA-543,613
