= 2-Acetyl-1-pyrroline =

- Skeletal formula of 2-acetyl-1-pyrroline

Names
- Preferred IUPAC name 1-(3,4-Dihydro-2H-pyrrol-5-yl)ethan-1-one
- Other names 1-(3,4-Dihydro-2H-pyrrol-5-yl)ethanone; 2-Acetyl-1-pyrroline

Identifiers
CAS Number	85213-22-5
3D model (JSmol)	Interactive image
ChEBI	CHEBI:67125
ChemSpider	456071
MeSH	2-Acetyl-1-pyrroline
PubChem CID	522834
UNII	IGC0W6LY94
CompTox Dashboard (EPA)	DTXSID40335080
- InChI: InChI=1S/C6H9NO/c1-5(8)6-3-2-4-7-6/h2-4H2,1H3 Key: DQBQWWSFRPLIAX-UHFFFAOYSA-N; InChI=1/C6H9NO/c1-5(8)6-3-2-4-7-6/h2-4H2,1H3 Key: DQBQWWSFRPLIAX-UHFFFAOYAG
- SMILES: CC(=O)C1=NCCC1

Properties
Chemical formula	C_{6}H_{9}NO
Molar mass	111.144 g·mol^{−1}
- Except where otherwise noted, data are given for materials in their standard state (at 25 °C [77 °F], 100 kPa). verify (what is ?) Infobox references

2-Acetyl-1-pyrroline (2AP) is an organic compound with the formula CH_{3}C(O)C_{4}H_{6}N. In terms of structure, it is a derivative of 1-pyrroline. It is an aroma compound and flavor that gives freshly baked bread, jasmine rice and basmati rice, the herb pandan (Pandanus amaryllifolius), and bread flowers (Vallaris glabra) their customary smell. Many observers describe the smell as similar to "hot, buttered popcorn" 2AP and its structural homolog, 6-acetyl-2,3,4,5-tetrahydropyridine of similar smell, can be formed by Maillard reactions during heating of food such as the baking of bread dough. Both compounds have odor thresholds below 0.06 ng/L.

== Other ==
It has also been credited for lending this odor to the scent of binturong (bearcat) urine. Fresh marking fluid (MF) and urine of the tiger (Indian, Amur or Siberian) and Indian leopard also have a strong aroma due to 2AP.

== Structure and properties ==
2AP is a substituted pyrroline and a cyclic imine as well as a ketone.
