= 6-Acetyl-2,3,4,5-tetrahydropyridine =

Names
- Preferred IUPAC name 1-(3,4,5,6-Tetrahydropyridin-2-yl)ethan-1-one
- Other names 1-(3,4,5,6-Tetrahydropyridin-2-yl)ethanone; 2-Acetyl-3,4,5,6-tetrahydropyridine

Identifiers
| CAS Number | 27300-27-2; 25343-57-1 tautomer |
| 3D model (JSmol) | Interactive image; Interactive image |
| Beilstein Reference | 1446593, 1446593 |
| ChEBI | CHEBI:59533; CHEBI:59534 tautomer |
| ChemSpider | 453844 |
| PubChem CID | 520194 tautomer |
| UNII | D3A5PA4S6W |
| CompTox Dashboard (EPA) | DTXSID00865358 |
- InChI: InChI=1S/C7H11NO/c1-6(9)7-4-2-3-5-8-7/h2-5H2,1H3 Key: GNZWXNKZMHJXNU-UHFFFAOYSA-N; InChI=1/C7H11NO/c1-6(9)7-4-2-3-5-8-7/h2-5H2,1H3 Key: GNZWXNKZMHJXNU-UHFFFAOYAY
- SMILES: O=C(C)C1=NCCCC1; O=C(/C1=N/CCCC1)C

Properties
| Chemical formula | C_{7}H_{11}NO |
| Molar mass | 125.171 g·mol^{−1} |
- Except where otherwise noted, data are given for materials in their standard state (at 25 °C [77 °F], 100 kPa). verify (what is ?) Infobox references

6-Acetyl-2,3,4,5-tetrahydropyridine is an aroma compound and flavor that gives baked goods such as white bread, popcorn, and tortillas their typical smell, together with its structural homolog 2-acetyl-1-pyrroline.

6-Acetyl-2,3,4,5-tetrahydropyridine and 2-acetyl-1-pyrroline are usually formed by Maillard reactions during heating of food. Both compounds have odor thresholds below 0.06 ng/L.

== Structure and properties ==
6-Acetyl-2,3,4,5-tetrahydropyridine is a substituted tetrahydropyridine and a cyclic imine as well as a ketone. The compound exists in a chemical equilibrium with its tautomer 6-acetyl-1,2,3,4-tetrahydropyridine that differs only by the position of the double bond in the tetrahydropyridine ring:

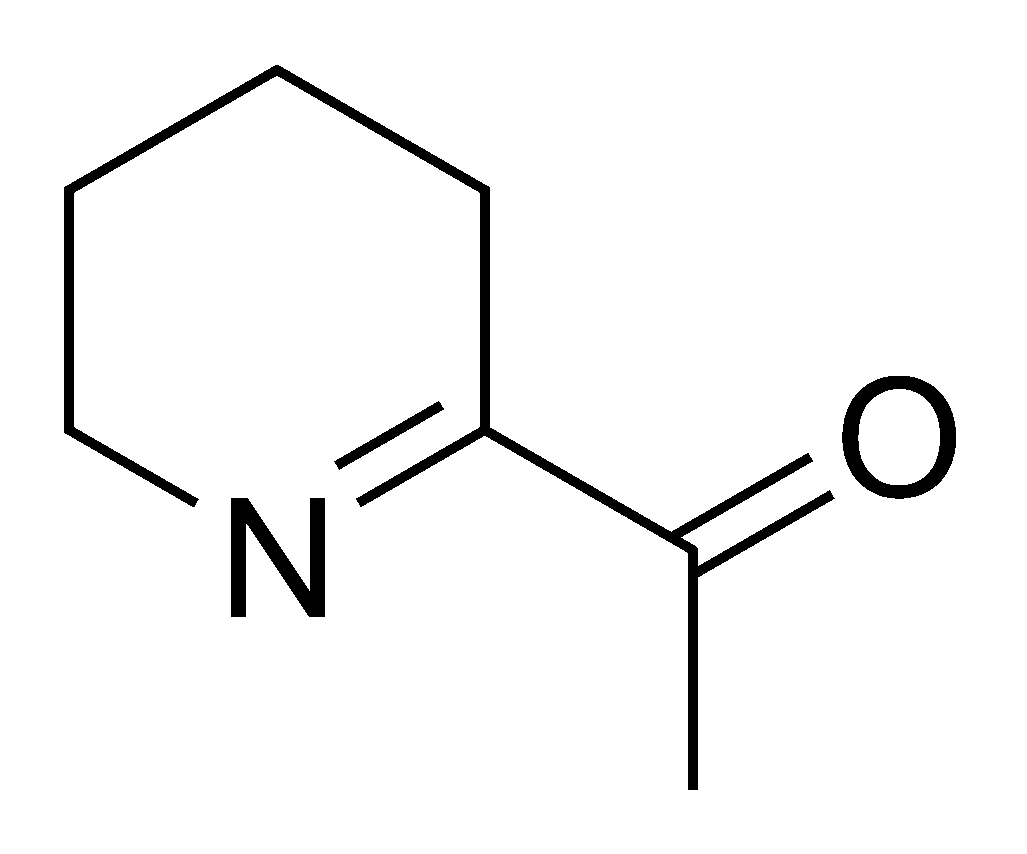
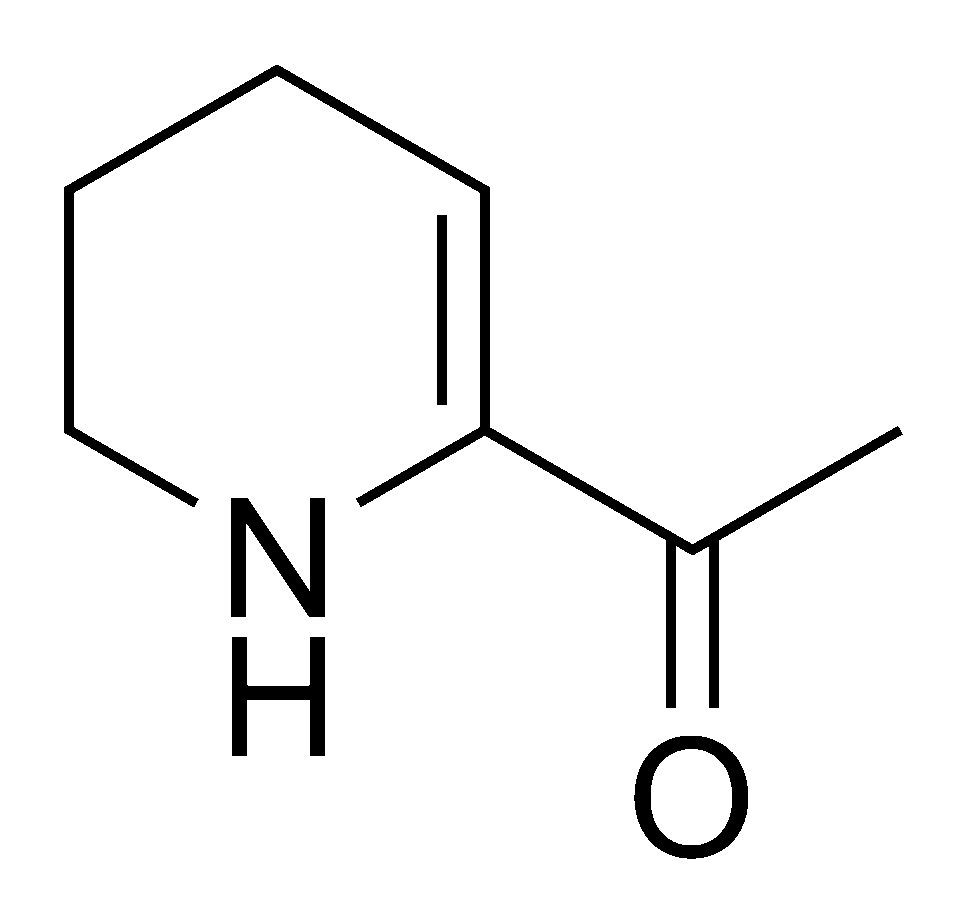
| | $\rightleftharpoons$ |
| 6-Acetyl-2,3,4,5-tetrahydropyridine | (1 : 2) | 6-Acetyl-1,2,3,4-tetrahydropyridine |
