= Diazinane =

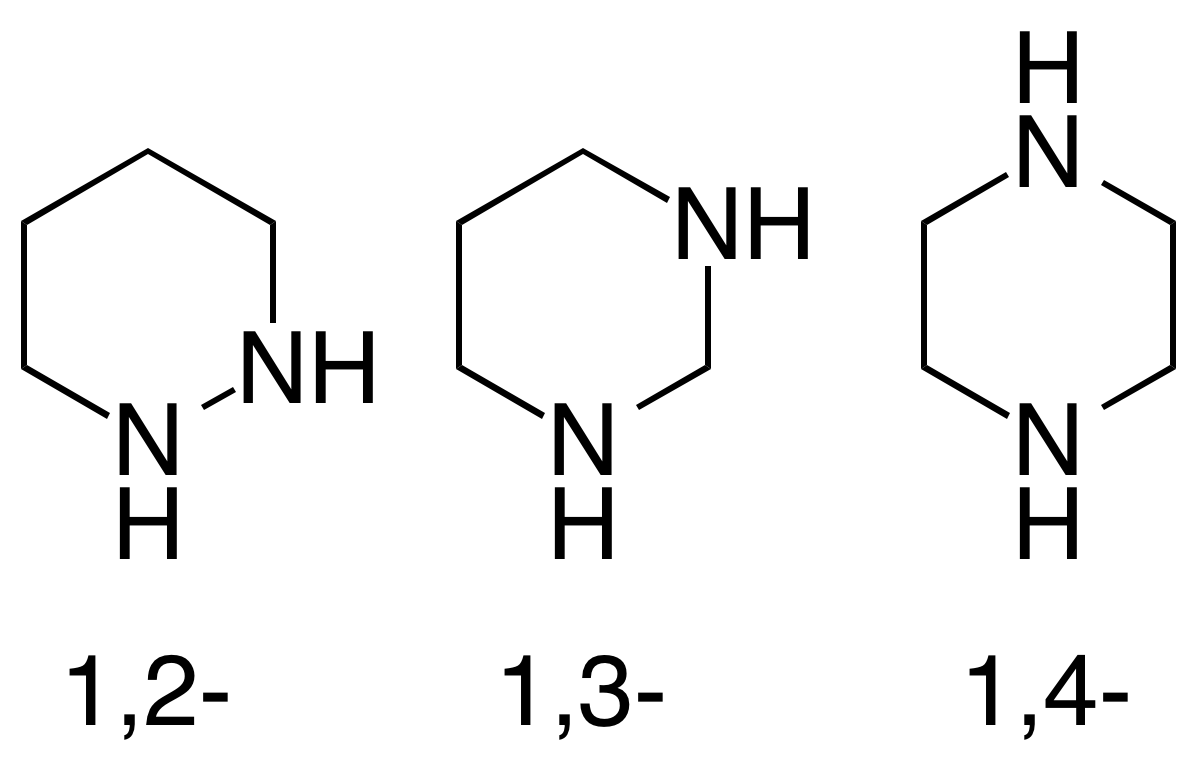

Identifiers
CAS Number	1,2: 505-19-1; 1,3: 505-21-5; 1,4: 110-85-0
3D model (JSmol)	1,2: Interactive image; 1,3: Interactive image; 1,4: Interactive image
ChemSpider	1,2: 120108; 1,3: 1249456; 1,4: 13835459
EC Number	1,4: 203-808-3
PubChem CID	1,2: 136334; 1,3: 1519487; 1,4: 4837
RTECS number	1,4: TK7800000
UNII	1,4: 1RTM4PAL0V
- InChI: 1,2: InChI=1S/C4H10N2/c1-2-4-6-5-3-1/h5-6H,1-4H2 Key: HTFFABIIOAKIBH-UHFFFAOYSA-N; 1,3: InChI=1S/C4H10N2/c1-2-5-4-6-3-1/h5-6H,1-4H2 Key: DKYBVKMIZODYKL-UHFFFAOYSA-N; 1,4: InChI=1S/C4H10N2/c1-2-6-4-3-5-1/h5-6H,1-4H2 Key: GLUUGHFHXGJENI-UHFFFAOYSA-N
- SMILES: 1,2: C1CCNNC1; 1,3: C1CNCNC1; 1,4: C1CNCCN1

Properties
Chemical formula	C_{4}H_{10}N_{2}
Molar mass	86.138 g·mol^{−1}
- Except where otherwise noted, data are given for materials in their standard state (at 25 °C [77 °F], 100 kPa). Infobox references

Diazinanes or hexahydrodiazines are a class of nitrogen-containing heterocycles consisting of a saturated four-carbon, two-nitrogen ring. They exist in three isomeric forms depending on the relative position of the two nitrogen atoms, with 1,4-diazinanes being common.

== Structure ==
The diazinanes have six-membered cyclohexane-like ring but with two carbon atoms replaced by nitrogen atoms. The three isomers of diazinane are distinguished by the positions of their nitrogen atoms, and are referred to as 1,2-diazinane, 1,3-diazinane, and 1,4-diazinane (more commonly called piperazine).

== See also ==
- 6-membered saturated rings with one nitrogen atom: Piperidine
- 6-membered saturated rings with two nitrogen atoms: Diazinane
  - Piperazine
  - Hexahydropyrimidine
  - Hexahydropyridazine
- 6-membered aromatic rings with two nitrogen atoms: Diazine
  - Pyrazine
  - pyrimidine
  - pyridazine
- 6-membered saturated rings with three nitrogen atoms Triazinane
  - Hexahydro-1,3,5-triazine
