= Nicotelline =

Names
- IUPAC name 3,2′:4′,3′′-Terpyridine
- Other names Nicotellin; 2,4-Dipyridin-3-ylpyridine

Identifiers
CAS Number	494-04-2
3D model (JSmol)	Interactive image
ChemSpider	61431
PubChem CID	68123
UNII	7AO144V8IZ
CompTox Dashboard (EPA)	DTXSID40197781
- InChI: InChI=1S/C15H11N3/c1-3-13(10-16-6-1)12-5-8-18-15(9-12)14-4-2-7-17-11-14/h1-11H Key: OILSPHJMIPYURT-UHFFFAOYSA-N
- SMILES: C1=CC(=CN=C1)C2=CC(=NC=C2)C3=CN=CC=C3

Properties
Chemical formula	C_{15}H_{11}N_{3}
Molar mass	233.274 g·mol^{−1}
Melting point	147–148 °C (297–298 °F; 420–421 K)
- Except where otherwise noted, data are given for materials in their standard state (at 25 °C [77 °F], 100 kPa). Infobox references

Nicotelline is an alkaloid first identified in 1914 as a chemical constituent of tobacco plants (genus Nicotiana).

The chemical structure of nicotelline wasn't elucidated until 1956, when it was determined that nicotelline is a terpyridine consisting of three linked pyridine rings. This structure was confirmed by laboratory synthesis. Nicotelline has the molecular formula C_{15}H_{11}N_{3}. It is a white crystalline solid with a melting point of 147-148 °C. It is soluble in hot water, chloroform, ethanol, and benzene.

Nicotelline has long been known to be a constituent of tobacco smoke. As such, it has recently been proposed as a biomarker or environmental tracer for tobacco smoking.
