= Maillard reaction =

Chemical reaction that gives browned food flavor

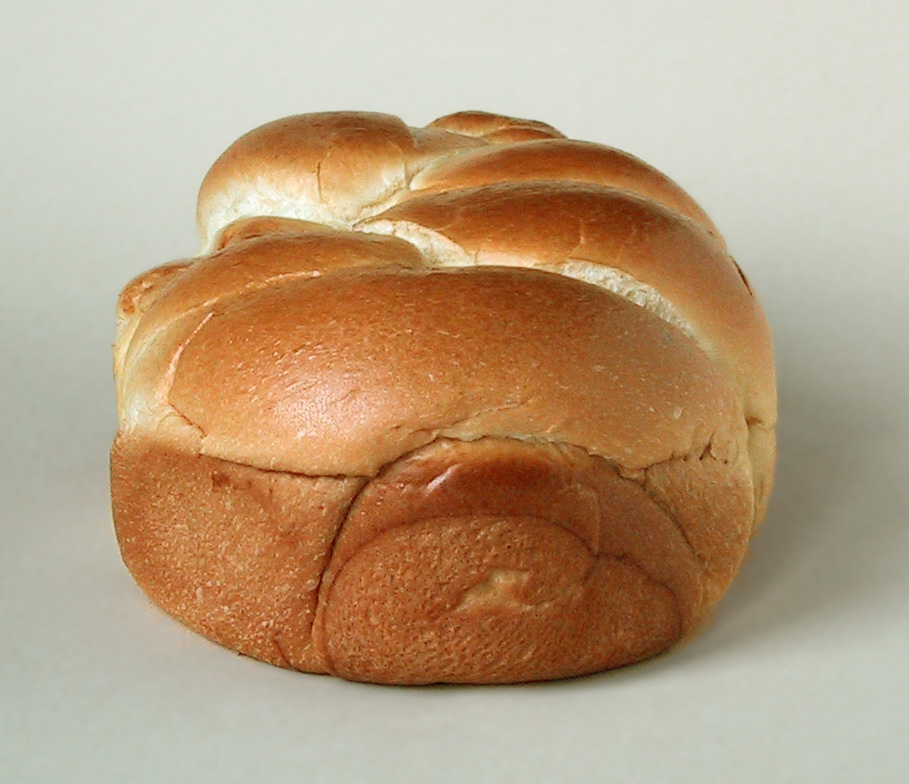
The crusts of most breads, such as this brioche, are golden-brown mostly as a result of the Maillard reaction.

The Maillard reaction (/ˈmaɪjɑːr(d)/ MY-ar(d); French: [majaʁ]) is a chemical reaction between amino acids and reducing sugars to create melanoidins, the compounds that give browned food its distinctive flavor. Seared steaks, fried dumplings, cookies and other kinds of biscuits, breads, toasted marshmallows, falafel and many other foods undergo this reaction. It is named after French chemist Louis Camille Maillard, who first described it in 1912 while attempting to reproduce biological protein synthesis. The reaction is a form of non-enzymatic browning which typically proceeds rapidly from around 140 to 165 °C (280 to 330 °F). Many recipes call for an oven temperature high enough to ensure that a Maillard reaction occurs. At higher temperatures, caramelization (the browning of sugars, a distinct process) and subsequently pyrolysis (final breakdown leading to burning and the development of acrid flavors) become more pronounced.

The reactive carbonyl group of the sugar reacts with the nucleophilic amino group of the amino acid and forms a complex mixture of poorly characterized molecules responsible for a range of aromas and flavors. This process is accelerated in an alkaline environment (e.g., lye applied to darken pretzels; see lye roll), as the amino groups (RNH^{+}_{3} → RNH_{2}) are deprotonated, and hence have an increased nucleophilicity. This reaction is the basis for many of the flavoring industry's recipes. At high temperatures, a probable carcinogen called acrylamide can form. This can be discouraged by heating at a lower temperature, adding asparaginase, or injecting carbon dioxide.

In the cooking process, Maillard reactions can produce hundreds of different flavor compounds depending on the chemical constituents in the food, the temperature, the cooking time, and the presence of air. These compounds, in turn, often break down to form yet more flavor compounds. Flavorists have used the Maillard reaction over the years to make artificial flavors, the majority of patents being related to the production of meat-like flavors. According to chemistry Nobel Prize winner Jean-Marie Lehn "The Maillard is, by far, the most widely practiced chemical reaction in the world".

== History ==
In 1912, Louis Camille Maillard published a paper describing the reaction between amino acids and sugars at elevated temperatures. In 1953, chemist John E. Hodge with the U.S. Department of Agriculture established a mechanism for the Maillard reaction.

== Foods and products ==
6-Acetyl-2,3,4,5-tetrahydropyridine

2-Acetylpyrroline

The Maillard reaction is responsible for many colors and flavors in foods, such as the browning of various meats when seared or grilled, the browning and umami taste in fried onions and coffee roasting. It contributes to the darkened crust of baked goods, the golden-brown color of French fries and other crisps, browning of malted barley as found in malt whiskey and beer, and the color and taste of dried and condensed milk, dulce de leche, black garlic, chocolate, toasted marshmallows, and roasted peanuts.

6-Acetyl-2,3,4,5-tetrahydropyridine is responsible for the biscuit or cracker-like flavor present in baked goods such as bread, popcorn, and tortilla products. The structurally related compound 2-acetyl-1-pyrroline has a similar smell and also occurs naturally without heating. The compound gives varieties of cooked rice and the herb pandan (Pandanus amaryllifolius) their typical smells. Both compounds have odor thresholds below 0.06 nanograms per liter.

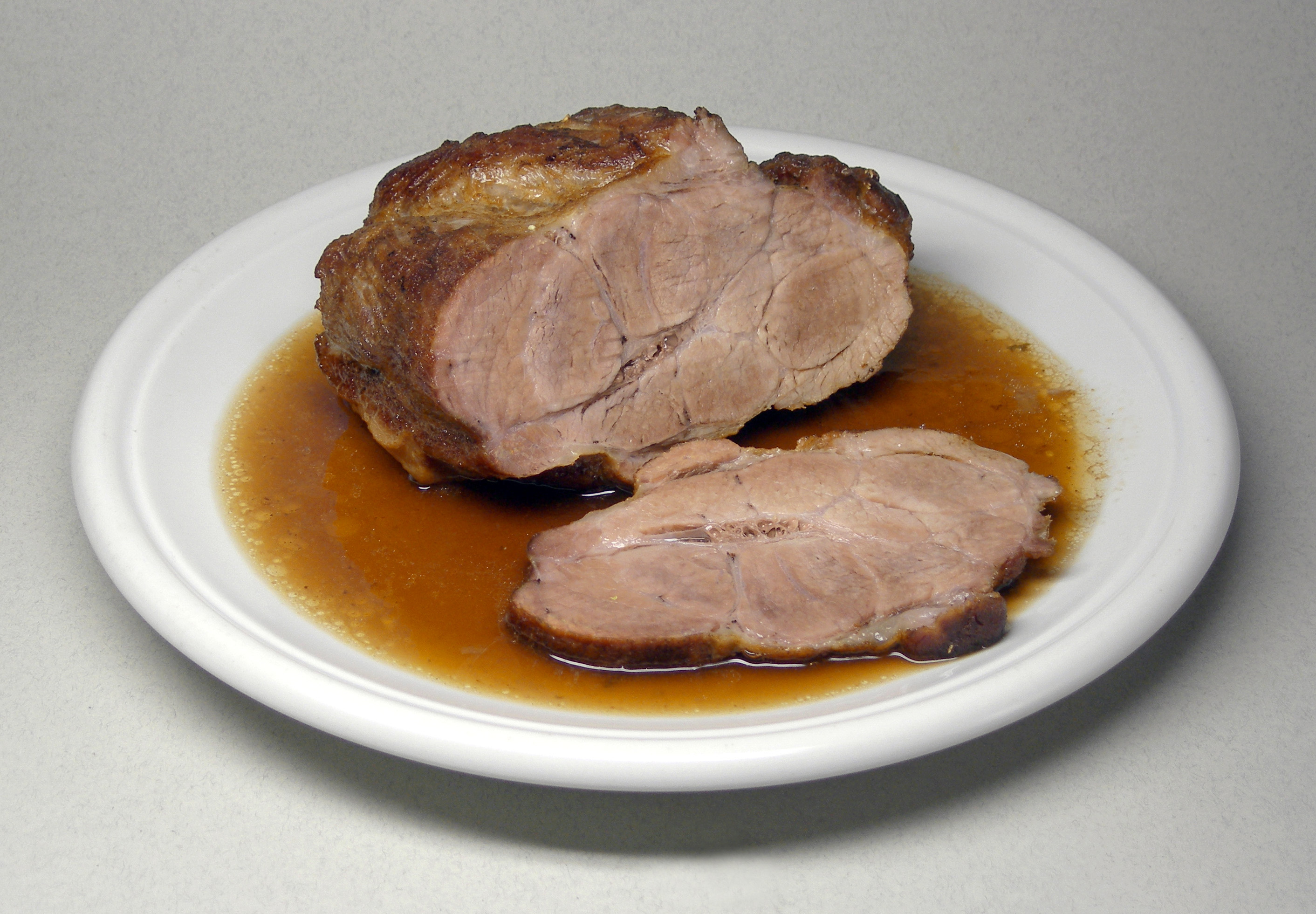
Roast pork, browned using the Maillard reaction

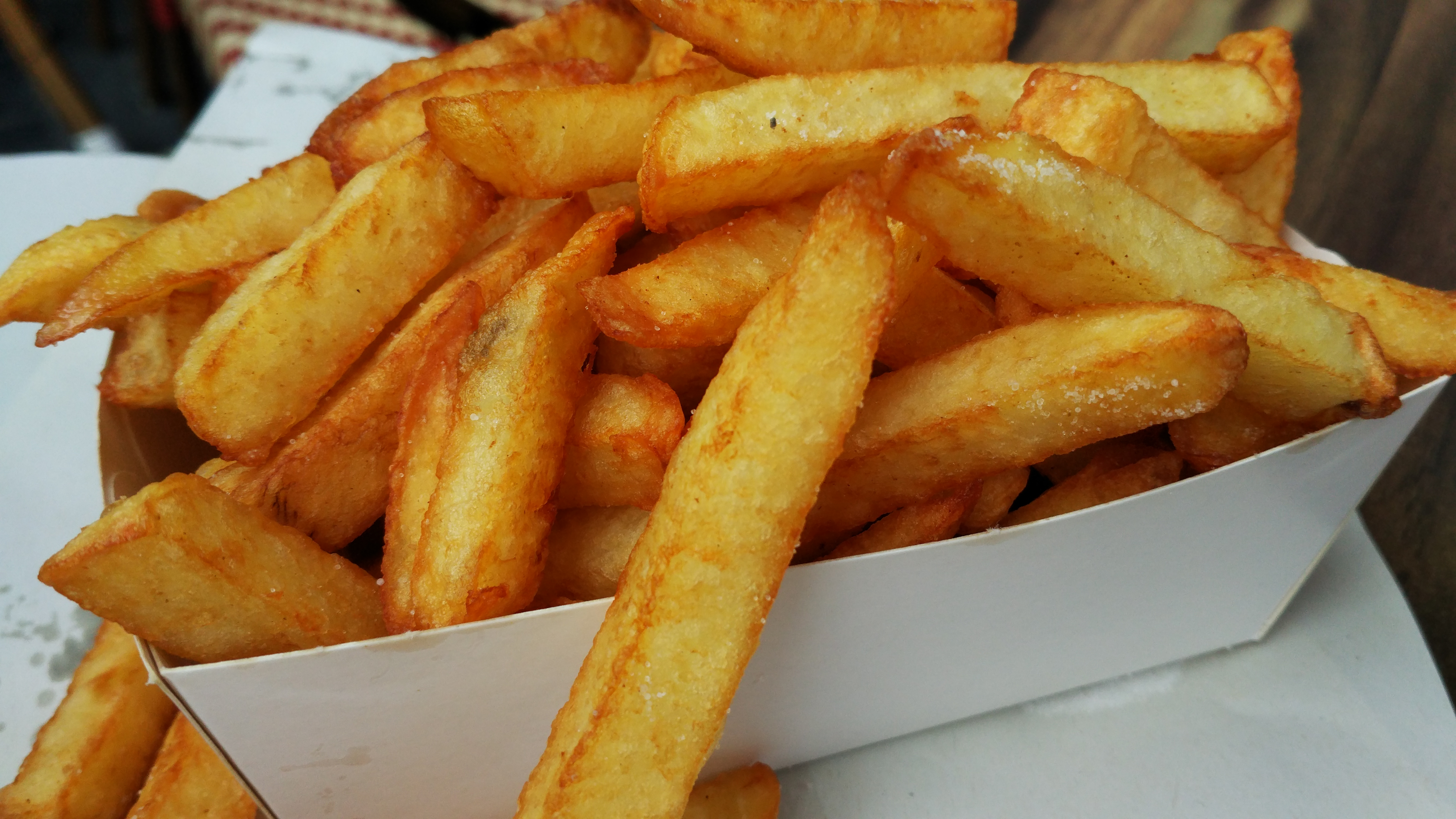
The preparation of French fries at high temperature can lead to the formation of acrylamide.

The browning reactions that occur when meat is roasted or seared are complex and occur mostly by Maillard browning with contributions from other chemical reactions, including the breakdown of the tetrapyrrole rings of the muscle protein myoglobin. Maillard reactions also occur in dried fruit and when champagne ages in the bottle.

Caramelization is an entirely different process from Maillard browning, though the results of the two processes are sometimes similar to the naked eye (and taste buds). Caramelization may sometimes cause browning in the same foods in which the Maillard reaction occurs, but the two processes are distinct. They are both promoted by heating, but the Maillard reaction involves amino acids, whereas caramelization is the pyrolysis of certain sugars.

In the production of animal feed, the Maillard reaction can reduce feed quality by reducing the digestibility of amino acids. In making silage, excess heat causes the Maillard reaction to occur, which reduces the amount of energy and protein available to the animals that feed on it.

== Archaeology and paleontology ==
In archaeology, the Maillard process occurs when bodies are preserved in peat bogs. The acidic peat environment causes a tanning or browning of skin tones and can turn hair to a red or ginger tone. The chemical mechanism is the same as in the browning of food, but it develops slowly over time due to the acidic action on the bog body. It is typically seen on Iron Age bodies and is the result of the interaction of anaerobic, acidic, and cold (typically 4 °C (39 °F)) sphagnum acid on the polysaccharides.

The Maillard reaction also contributes to the preservation of paleofeces.

== Chemical mechanism ==
1. The carbonyl group of the sugar reacts with the amino group of the amino acid, producing N-substituted glycosylamine and water
2. The unstable glycosylamine undergoes Amadori rearrangement, forming ketosamines
3. Several ways are known for the ketosamines to react further:
  - Produce two water molecules and reductones
  - Diacetyl, pyruvaldehyde, and other short-chain hydrolytic fission products can be formed.
  - Produce brown nitrogenous polymers and melanoidins

The open-chain Amadori products undergo further dehydration and deamination to produce dicarbonyls. This is a crucial intermediate.

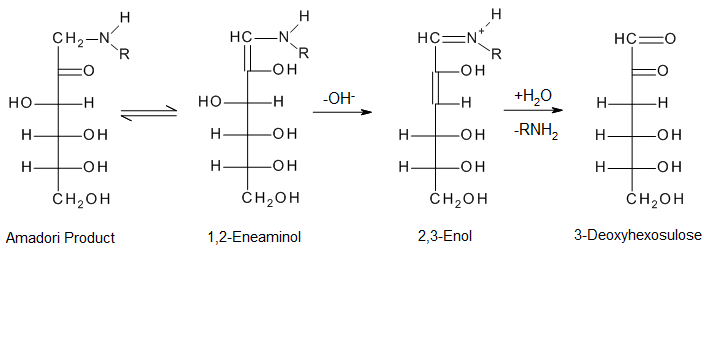

Dicarbonyls react with amines to produce Strecker aldehydes through Strecker degradation.

Acrylamide, a possible human carcinogen, can be generated as a byproduct of the Maillard reaction between reducing sugars and amino acids, especially asparagine, both of which are present in most food products.

== See also ==
- Akabori amino-acid reaction
- Advanced glycation end-product
- Baking
- Caramelization
- Wok hei
