= Glucosepane =

Names
- IUPAC name (2S)-2-Amino-6-((6R,7S)-2-(((S)-4-amino-4-carboxybutyl)amino)-6,7-dihydroxy-6,7,8,8a-tetrahydroimidazo[4,5-b]azepin-4(5H)-yl)hexanoic acid
- Other names Glucosepan

Identifiers
CAS Number	257290-23-6
3D model (JSmol)	Interactive image
ChemSpider	26333276
PubChem CID	135565852
UNII	66K23JT22H
CompTox Dashboard (EPA)	DTXSID80894863
- InChI: InChI=1S/C18H32N6O6/c19-10(16(27)28)4-1-2-7-24-9-14(26)13(25)8-12-15(24)23-18(22-12)21-6-3-5-11(20)17(29)30/h10-14,25-26H,1-9,19-20H2,(H,21,22)(H,27,28)(H,29,30)/t10-,11-,12?,13-,14+/m0/s1 Key: JTMICRULXGWYCN-WSOGJNRSSA-N; InChI=1/C18H32N6O6/c19-10(16(27)28)4-1-2-7-24-9-14(26)13(25)8-12-15(24)23-18(22-12)21-6-3-5-11(20)17(29)30/h10-14,25-26H,1-9,19-20H2,(H,21,22)(H,27,28)(H,29,30)/t10-,11-,12?,13-,14+/m0/s1 Key: JTMICRULXGWYCN-WSOGJNRSBX
- SMILES: C1[C@@H]([C@@H](CN(C2=NC(=NC21)NCCC[C@@H](C(=O)O)N)CCCC[C@@H](C(=O)O)N)O)O

Properties
Chemical formula	C_{18}H_{32}N_{6}O_{6}
Molar mass	428.490 g·mol^{−1}

Related compounds
Related AGEs	Pentosidine
Related compounds	Arginine; Lysine
- Except where otherwise noted, data are given for materials in their standard state (at 25 °C [77 °F], 100 kPa). verify (what is ?) Infobox references

Glucosepane is a lysine-arginine protein cross-linking product and advanced glycation end product (AGE) derived from D-glucose. It is an irreversible, covalent cross-link product that has been found to make intermolecular and intramolecular cross-links in the collagen of the extracellular matrix (ECM) and crystallin of the eyes. Covalent protein cross-links irreversibly link proteins together in the ECM of tissues. Glucosepane is present in human tissues at levels 10 to 1000 times higher than any other cross-linking AGE, and is currently considered to be the most important cross-linking AGE.

== Role in aging ==
Aging leads to progressive loss of elasticity and stiffening of tissues rich in the ECM such as joints, cartilage, arteries, lungs and skin. It has been shown that these effects are brought about by the accumulation of cross-links in the ECM on long-lived proteins. Studies done on glucosepane by the Monnier group have shown that the level of glucosepane cross-links in human collagen in the ECM increases progressively with age and at a more rapid pace in people with diabetes, thus suggesting the role of glucosepane in the long-term effects associated with diabetes and aging such as arteriosclerosis, joint stiffening and skin wrinkling. In fact, they report that in the ECM of the skin of a non-diabetic 90-year-old, glucosepane accounts for about 50 times the protein cross-linking as all other forms of protein cross-linking. Further, the build up of cross-links such as glucosepane within and between proteins is shown to reduce proteolytic degradation in the ECM. This leads to increased cross-link accumulation and is thought to be linked to the thickening of basement membranes in capillaries, glomeruli, lens, and lungs.

Atomic-force microscopy experiments identified nanoscale morphologic differences in collagen fibril structures as a function of ageing in skin. A decrease in Young's modulus of the transverse fibril was observed. These changes are thought to be due to the accumulation of glucosepane in tissue. It is proposed that this is due to a change in the fibril density caused by age-related differences in water retention. Computational studies using all-atom simulations revealed that glucosepane results in less tightly held helical structure in the collagen molecule and increase porosity to water. This was confirmed with water content measurement that showed higher content in Achilles and anterior tibias tendon tissue from older individuals compared to young people.

== Formation ==
As an AGE, the reaction pathway that leads to glucosepane formation is known as the Maillard reaction, or non-enzymatic browning. Glucosepane is found to form through a non-oxidative path. The exact mechanism leading to glucosepane has been a challenge for researchers to determine. However, it is currently well characterized up to the ring formation.

The formation of glucosepane within connective tissues has been shown to be site-specific. For example, studies using molecular dynamics simulations of a complete collagen fibril revealed energetically favorable locations, particularly within the collagen fibril gap-region. This may be due to the lower protein density and higher intra-fibrillar water content within the gap-region.

=== Overall reaction pathway ===
The overall pathway of glucosepane formation starts with lysine attacking the reducing sugar D-glucose to form the unstable imine known as a Schiff base, which then rearranges to form the more stable aminoketose Amadori product. From there, the stable Amadori Product slowly degrades to form glucosepane through an α-dicarbonyl intermediate.

==== Mechanism of α-dicarbonyl formation from the Amadori product ====
The particular reaction path proceeding from the Amadori product to the α-dicarbonyl intermediate that will yield glucosepane was difficult to determine. Initially, researchers hypothesized an α-dicarbonyl intermediate in which the carbonyls were located on C-2 and C-3 of D-Glucose. However, by using glucose with C-1, the carbonyl carbon, marked with the isotope ^{13}C in the reaction, researchers found that the α-dicarbonyl formed has the carbonyls located at C-5 and C-6 of the original glucose backbone. The best mechanism proposed is that the α-dicarbonyl N 6-(2,3-dihydroxy-5,6-dioxohexyl)-L-lysinate, a key intermediate in the glucosepane reaction, forms from the Amadori product through a carbonyl shift all the way down the 6 carbon sugar backbone by keto-enol tautomerism and the elimination of the C-4 hydroxyl. By using the solvent D_{2}O, researchers found that all the H-C-OH of the carbon backbone were converted to D-C-OH after the reaction, demonstrating that all the hydrogens got transferred out through keto-enol tautomerism, and thus the carbonyl shift went all the way down the backbone, finally eliminating the C-4 hydroxy group.

==== Ring closure to arginine cross-linking ====
Ring closure is believed to occur following the formation of the α-dicarbonyl, via the intramolecular aldimine 6-(3,4-dihydroxy-6-oxo-3,4,5,6-tetrahydro-2H-azepinium-1-yl) norleucine. The ring is hypothesized to form by a nucleophilic attack of N on C-6 carbonyl, followed by elimination of a water. This then condenses with the arginine side chain to yield glucosepane in nucleophilic addition-elimination reactions of the nitrogens of arginine and the electrophilic carbonyls on the ring, eliminating two waters.

== Accumulation ==
Glycation processes that lead to AGEs particularly affect long-lived proteins in the human body, such as collagen in the skin and crystallin in the eyes. Skin collagen, for instance, has a half-life of fifteen years. Because these proteins do not degrade as quickly as other proteins in the body, the Amadori product, which is stable and thus transforms very slowly, has time enough to convert into glucosepane. It has been estimated that 50-60% of the steady state levels of Amadori product is converted into glucosepane in old age. A suspected reason for the prevalence of the glucosepane cross-link product as opposed to others is that the α−dicarbonyl from which it forms, N 6-(2,3-dihydroxy-5,6-dioxohexyl)-L-lysinate, is a persisting glycating agent because it is irreversibly bound through lysine to a protein. Therefore, it is not easily degraded and thus is more commonly available to form a cross-link with arginine, unlike other cross-link α-dicarbonyl intermediates, which are found bound and free and thus more susceptible to being degraded by enzymes in the ECM.

== Detection ==
A Glu3 aptamer was developed that is highly specific towards glucosepane. The aptamer provides a new and effective tool for studying this molecule. Glu3 enabled the first-ever direct, fluorescence-based histological staining of glucosepane in tissue samples (diabetic mouse skin versus healthy mouse skin).

== Prospects for inhibition or removal ==
Because of the important role glucosepane has been found to play in many pathologies of aging, many researchers have been investigating ways in which the levels of glucosepane could be reduced in tissues. Various methods of doing so have been examined.

=== α-Dicarbonyl trap ===
One method attempted to inhibit glucosepane formation is to use an α-dicarbonyl trap molecule, aminoguanidine (AG). AG reacts with the α-dicarbonyl intermediate with a higher affinity than arginine, thus blocking the cross-link. While this method has been seen to have some success, it did not greatly interfere with the normal aging of rats.

=== Thiazolium salts ===
Another method that has been investigated is the use of thiazolium salts to break the α-dicarbonyl intermediate, therefore cutting off the reaction pathway that leads to glucosepane. These compounds are thought to act as bidentate nucleophiles that attack the adjacent carbonyls in the alpha-dicarbonyl intermediate, which then leads to the cleaving of the C-C bond between the carbonyls. However, an alternate hypothesis as to how they work is that they act as chelating agents. Two thiazolium molecules, N-phenacylthiazolium bromide (PTB) and ALT-711, have demonstrated success at reducing advanced glycation endproduct levels in rats.

=== ECM turnover ===
A completely different approach to reducing cross-links that has been proposed is enhancing the ECM turnover processes, which would force the degradation of cross-linked proteins to replace them with new. However, a potential downside to this would be leaky blood vessels resulting from too far enhanced turnover.

== See also ==
- Glycation
- Glycosylation
- Advanced glycation end product
- Maillard reaction
