= Imazaquin =

- Imazaquin

Names
- Systematic IUPAC name 3-Quinolinecarboxylic acid, 2-[4,5-dihydro-4-methyl-4-(1-methylethyl)-5-oxo-1H-imidazol-2-yl]-

Identifiers
CAS Number	81335-37-7
3D model (JSmol)	Interactive image
ChEBI	CHEBI:5869
ChEMBL	ChEMBL1447880
ChemSpider	49446
DrugBank	DB04582
ECHA InfoCard	100.120.551
EC Number	617-220-3
KEGG	C05076
PubChem CID	54739
UNII	8LZY7C31XA
CompTox Dashboard (EPA)	DTXSID3024152
- InChI: InChI=1S/C17H17N3O3/c1-9(2)17(3)16(23)19-14(20-17)13-11(15(21)22)8-10-6-4-5-7-12(10)18-13/h4-9H,1-3H3,(H,21,22)(H,19,20,23) Key: CABMTIJINOIHOD-UHFFFAOYSA-N
- SMILES: O=C(O)c2c(nc1ccccc1c2)/C3=N/C(C(=O)N3)(C(C)C)C

Properties
Chemical formula	C_{17}H_{17}N_{3}O_{3}
Molar mass	311.341 g·mol^{−1}
Appearance	colorless solid
Density	1.35 g/cm^{3}
Melting point	219 to 222 °C (426 to 432 °F; 492 to 495 K)
Solubility in water	Soluble in water at 25 °C: 60-120 ppm
log P	1.474±0.662
Vapor pressure	0.013 mPa @ 60 °C
Acidity (pK_{a})	3.10±0.30

Hazards
- Occupational safety and health (OHS/OSH)
Main hazards	May be harmful if swallowed. Harmful in contact with skin.
- GHS labelling
Pictograms	(GHS07: Exclamation mark) (GHS09: Environmental hazard)
Signal word	Warning
Hazard statements	H312, H410
Precautionary statements	P273, P280, P302+P352, P317, P321, P362+P364, P391, P501
- Except where otherwise noted, data are given for materials in their standard state (at 25 °C [77 °F], 100 kPa). Infobox references

Imazaquin is an imidazolinone herbicide, so named because it contains an imidazolinone core. This organic compound is used to control a broad spectrum of weed species. It is a colorless or white solid, although commercial samples can appear brown or tan.

== Imidazolinone herbicides ==
Imazaquin along with imazamethabenz-methyl, imazapyr, imazapic, imazethapyr, and imazamox comprise the class of synthetic compounds termed the imidazolinone herbicides. These chemicals all feature an imidazolinone ring with a carboxylic acid group attached to the backbone. They vary in the attached ring structure.

Imidazolinone herbicides kill plants by inhibiting acetohydroxy acid synthase (AHAS). AHAS is the first enzyme in the branched-chain amino acid pathway that leads to the synthesis of amino acids leucine, isoleucine, and valine. Crop varieties have been developed through conventional breeding that are resistant to these herbicides and are marketed by BASF under the Clearfield brand.

Imazaquin's HRAC classification is Group B (global, Aus), Group 2 (numeric), as it is an acetohydroxyacid synthase inhibitor.

== History ==
The imidazolinone herbicides were first discovered in the 1970s. The first U.S. patent was awarded in 1980 for imazamethabenz-methyl. Imazaquin, imazapyr, imazapic, and imazethpyr followed suit and received patents in 1989. Imazamox, the last of the six, received its U.S. patent in 1994.

The imidazolinone herbicides were discovered at American Cyanamid's Agricultural Research Division during the 1970s, starting from the initial lead molecule phthalimide. Years later, the molecule was found to exhibit herbicidal activity. The connection to AHAS was not understood at the time. A derivative of phthalimide showed promise when it exhibited some plant growth inhibition. Optimization ensued and the attempt to enable the production of field trial samples led to the formation of a tricyclic compound. The same reaction was performed on the original phthalimide, resulting in a compound that exhibited broad-spectrum herbicidal activity. Further exploration resulted in the formation of the first imidazolinone herbicide.

== Properties ==
Imazaquin has a water solubility of 60 mg/L and its half-life in soil is 60 days. It is therefore categorized as a moderately persistent pesticide.

When imazaquin is applied to crops its main interaction is with soil humic acids. It was found that the rate at which imazaquin aggregates on soil humic acids was most affected by the environmental pH. Imazaquin has shown greater adsorption at lower pHs. Adsorption is greatest at a pH nearest the pKa of the carboxylic group of imazaquin. At higher pHs, the hydrogen bonds and charge-transfer complexes that form during adsorption interactions are much weaker at higher pHs.

The sorption coefficient is a means of specifying a pesticide's tendency to bind to soil particles. The greater the coefficient, the higher the sorption potential. A higher sorption coefficient means more hindrance of movement and possibly an increase in persistence as a result of protection from degradation. Imazaquin has a sorption coefficient of 20.

== Uses ==
Imazaquin is primarily used as a herbicide to control weed growth on lawns and turf fields. Due to the fact that it is highly effective and selective, it is one of the most commonly used herbicides. It is classified as an imidazolinone herbicide that controls weed growth through the inhibition of specific amino acids that prove to be vital for plant growth. Imazaquin inhibits the acetohydroxy acid synthase (AHAS) enzyme accountable for synthesis of the amino acids valine, leucine, and isoleucine. When applied, imazaquin halts weed growth which eventually kills the weed or causes the weed to die due to its incapability to compete with surrounding vegetation.

Imazaquin may be applied pre-plant incorporated, pre-plant surface, pre-emergence, or early post-emergence.

== Synthesis ==

The reaction starts with the NH_{2} group of the benzenamine adding to the second carbonyl group on diethyl 2-oxobutanedioate (diethyl oxaloacetate).

== Toxicity ==
Imazaquin is a relatively nontoxic, non-carcinogenic chemical causing none to minimal eye and skin irritation if contacted upon the dermis, ingested orally, or inhaled. It has a toxicity classification of III, which corresponds to only a slight toxicity. It is a relatively low toxicity pesticide that has the potential to find its way into food, drinking water, and residential areas. Although exposure to residential areas affects infants and children, there is no concern over its presence due to its low estimated aggregated risk which meets the FQPA safety standards. Inhalation, dermal, and oral exposure to imazaquin yielded relatively low Margin of Exposure values issued by the EPA deeming imazaquin as a minimal risk concern.

=== Animals ===
A study conducted by Cornell University showed that imazaquin ingested by humans and animals was excreted within 48 hours, 94% through urine and 4% through feces. The LD_{50} for dogs, rats, rabbits, and female mice were each 1000 mg/kg, 5000 mg/kg, 2000 mg/kg, and 2363 mg/kg, respectively. Chronic toxicity studies were also conducted upon rabbits, rats, and beagle dogs. Chronic dermal exposure to imazaquin in rabbits during a 21-day time period yielded no effects upon the rabbits. A 90-day and one-year study of ingestion of imazaquin in rats also yielded no effects as well. However, in the one year, dietary chronic imazaquin exposure to beagle dogs, the dogs exposed to the highest dose of imazaquin per day, 5000 ppm, experienced effects such as decreased body weight gain, skeletal myopathy, slight anemia, bone marrow hyperplasia, increased blood levels of SGOT, DSGPT and CPK, and increased liver weight. Imazaquin is also nontoxic to birds and fish when properly used. Imazaquin tested negative for mutagen effects, organ toxicity, and reproductive effects.

=== Environment ===
Imazaquin is a non-volatile chemical leading to limited movement into soil that eventually breaks down within 4–6 months. The chemical breaks down microbially and is slowly reduced to carbon dioxide and metabolites. When present in soil, imazaquin is absorbed through the roots of plants where the chemical is either metabolized quickly with no effects or slowly metabolized or not metabolized at all which eventually will lead to the death of the plant. As for its breakdown in surface water, imazaquin has a hydrolytic half-life of 5.5 months at pH 9. At pH 3 and 5, it is stable to hydrolysis.
