= Imidazolone =

Class of chemical compounds

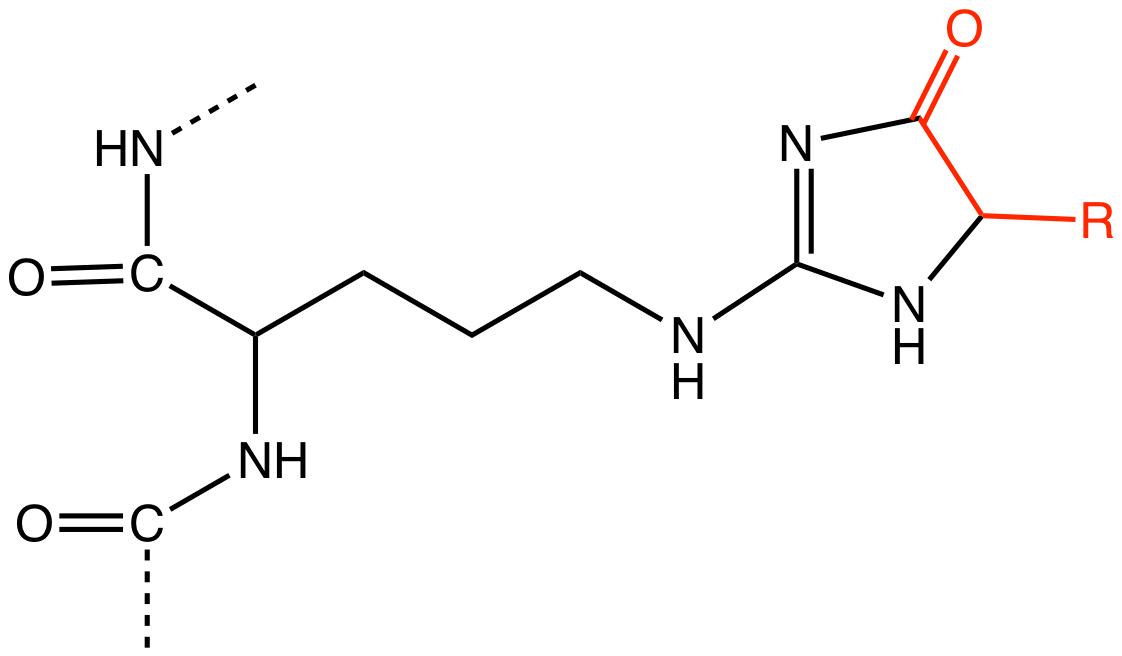
4-Imidazolones are advanced glycation endproducts (AGEs), a class of modified proteins that are biomarkers for diabetes. In this drawing the imidazolone is the C_{3}N_{2} ring in red and black.

Imidazolinones or imidazolones are a family of heterocyclic compounds, the parents of which have the formula C_{3}H_{4}N_{2}O, where the two nitrogen atoms are nonadjacent. Two isomers are possible, depending on the location of the carbonyl (CO) group. A common route to imidazol-2-ones involves condensation of ureas and acyloins. Some are of interest in the pharmaceuticals. 4-Imidazolones arise from the condensation of amidines with 1,2-dicarbonyls such as glyoxal.

Imidazolinone herbicides work by inhitibing acetolactate synthase and belong to the HRAC class of Group B (Australian, Global), Group 2 (numeric). These herbicides include imazapic, imazamethabenz-methyl, imazamox, imazapyr, imazaquin and imazethapyr.
