= Glycation =

Attachment of a sugar to a protein or lipid

Glycation (non-enzymatic glycosylation) is the covalent attachment of a sugar to a protein, lipid or nucleic acid molecule. Typical sugars that participate in glycation are glucose, fructose, galactose, and their derivatives. Glycation is the non-enzymatic process responsible for many (e.g. micro and macrovascular) complications in diabetes mellitus and is implicated in other diseases and in aging.

In contrast with glycation, glycosylation is the enzyme-mediated ATP-dependent attachment of sugars to a protein or lipid. Glycosylation occurs at defined sites on the target molecule. It is a common form of post-translational modification of proteins and is required for the functioning of the mature protein.

== Biochemistry ==
Glycation pathway via Amadori rearrangement (in HbA1c, R is typically N-terminal valine)

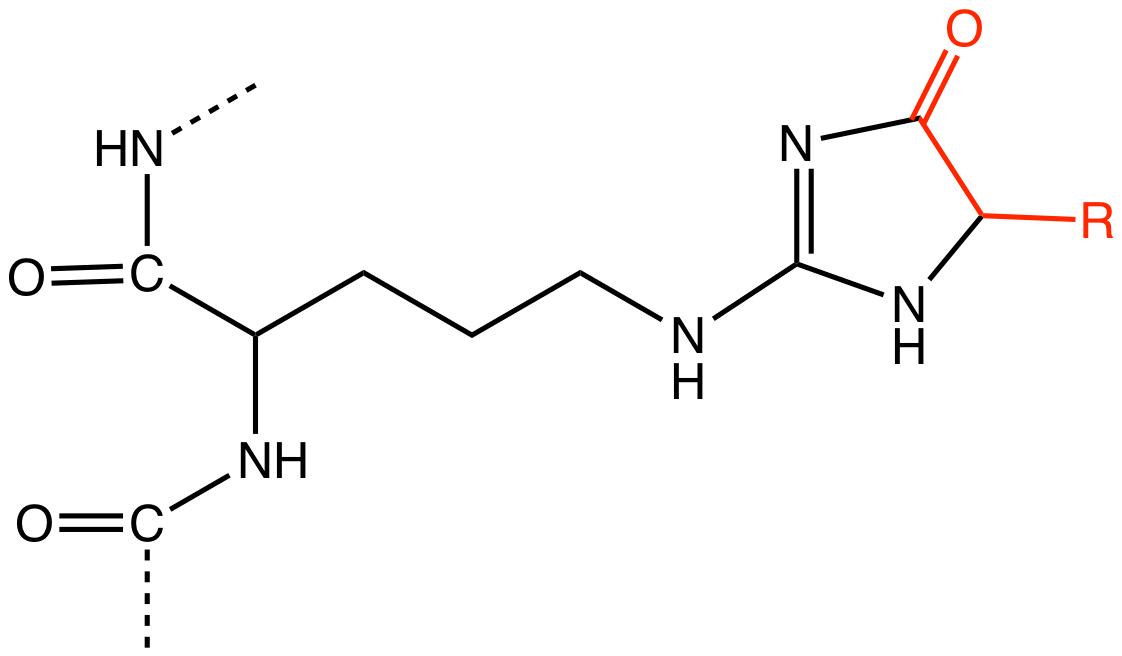
Imidazolones (R = CH_{2}CH(OH)CH(OH)CH_{2}OH) are typical glycation products. They arise by the condensation of 3-deoxyglucosone with the guanidine group of an arginine residue.

Glycations occur mainly in the bloodstream to a small proportion of absorbed simple sugars. Fructose has approximately ten times the glycation activity of glucose, the primary body fuel. Glycation can occur through Amadori reactions, Schiff base reactions, and Maillard reactions; which lead to advanced glycation end products (AGEs).

== Biomedical implications ==
Red blood cells have a consistent lifespan of 120 days and are accessible for measurement of glycated hemoglobin. Measurement of HbA1c—the predominant form of glycated hemoglobin—enables medium-term blood sugar control to be monitored in diabetes.

Some glycation products are implicated in age-related chronic diseases, including cardiovascular diseases (endothelium, fibrinogen, and collagen) and Alzheimer's disease (amyloid proteins are side-products of the reactions progressing to AGEs).

Long-lived cells (such as nerves and brain cells), long-lasting proteins (such as crystallins of the lens and cornea), and DNA can sustain substantial glycation over time. Damage by glycation results in stiffening of the collagen in blood vessel walls, increasing blood pressure, especially in diabetes. Glycations also cause weakening of the collagen in blood vessel walls, which may lead to micro- or macro-aneurysm; or strokes if in the brain.

A 2025 study reported that a combination of nicotinamide (a form of vitamin B3), ⍺-lipoic acid (ALA), thiamine (vitamin B1), pyridoxamine (a form of vitamin B6), and piperine reduced glycation damage in cell and mice models accompanied by non-muscle weight loss, apparently due to reduced Ghrelin and AMPK production.

A 2026 study reported the development of CMLase, an enzyme that oxidizes Nε-carboxymethyl-lysine (CML) and restores the native lysine residue in vitro and in elderly human tissue samples.

== DNA glycation ==
The term DNA glycation applies to DNA damage induced by reactive carbonyls (principally methylglyoxal and glyoxal) that are present in cells as by-products of sugar metabolism. DNA glycation can cause mutation, breaks in DNA and cytotoxicity. Guanine is the base most susceptible to glycation. Glycated DNA, as a form of damage, appears to be as frequent as oxidative DNA damage. Protein DJ-1 (also known as PARK7), is employed in the repair of glycated DNA bases in humans. DJ-1 homologs have been identified in bacteria.

== See also ==
- Advanced glycation end-product
- Alagebrium
- Fructose
- Galactose
- Glucose
- Glycosylation
- Glycated hemoglobin
- List of aging processes

== Additional reading ==
- Ahmed N, Furth AJ (July 1992). "Failure of common glycation assays to detect glycation by fructose". Clin. Chem. 38 (7): 1301–3. doi:10.1093/clinchem/38.7.1301. PMID 1623595.
- Vlassara H (June 2005). "Advanced glycation in health and disease: role of the modern environment". Annals of the New York Academy of Sciences. 1043 (1): 452–60. Bibcode:2005NYASA1043..452V. doi:10.1196/annals.1333.051. PMID 16037266. S2CID 20952378.
