= Fluorodeoxyglycosylamine =

Fluorodeoxyglycosylamine is a product of fluorodeoxyglucose and biological amines. The Maillard reaction of sugars and amines results in the formation of glycosylamines and Amadori products that are of biological significance, for drug delivery, role in central nervous system, and other potential applications.

This approach has also been used to prepare oximes of fluorodeoxyglucose using peptides, folic acid and rhodamine.

Fluorodeoxyglycosylamine in the form of fluorodeoxyglycosylamines (^{18}F) may be reduced to provide fluorodeoxyglucamine (^{18}F) as a positron emission tomography (PET) radiotracer.
