= 3DG =

3DG may refer to:

- 3-Deoxyglucosone
- Three Days Grace
- 3rd Dragoon Guards
