= Photolabile protecting group =

Chemical modification

A photolabile protecting group (PPG; also known as: photoremovable, photosensitive, or photocleavable protecting group) is a chemical modification to a molecule that can be removed with light. PPGs enable high degrees of chemoselectivity as they allow researchers to control spatial, temporal and concentration variables with light. Control of these variables is valuable as it enables multiple PPG applications, including orthogonality in systems with multiple protecting groups. As the removal of a PPG does not require chemical reagents, the photocleavage of a PPG is often referred to as "traceless reagent processes", and is often used in biological model systems and multistep organic syntheses. Since their introduction in 1962, numerous PPGs have been developed and utilized in a variety of wide-ranging applications from protein science to photoresists. Due to the large number of reported protecting groups, PPGs are often categorized by their major functional group(s); three of the most common classifications are detailed below.

== Historical introduction ==
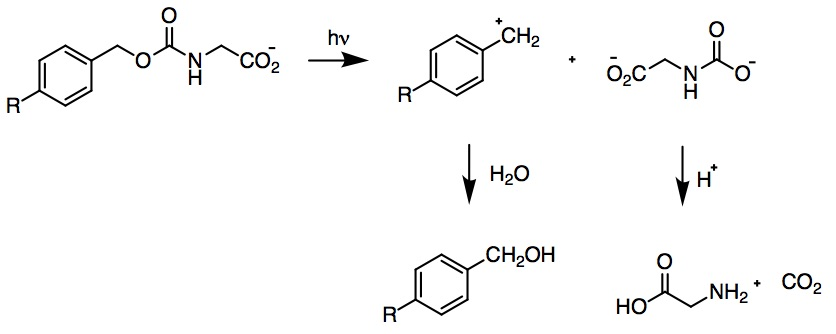
Figure 1. Barltrop and Schofield's initial demonstration of a photolabile protecting group.

The first reported use of a PPG in the scientific literature was by Barltrop and Schofield, who in 1962 used 253.7 nm light to release glycine from N-benzylglycine. Following this initial report, the field rapidly expanded throughout the 1970s as Kaplan and Epstein studied PPGs in a variety of biochemical systems. During this time, a series of standards for evaluating PPG performance was compiled. An abbreviated list of these standards, which are commonly called the Lester rules, or Sheehan criteria are summarized below:

- In biological systems, the protected substrate, as well as the photoproducts should be highly soluble in water; in synthesis, this requirement is not as strict
- The protected substrate, as well as the photoproducts should be stable in the photolysis environment
- Separation of the PPG should exhibit a quantum yield greater than 0.10
- Separation of the PPG should occur through a primary photochemical process
- The chromophore should absorb incident light with reasonable absorptivity
- The excitation wavelength of light should be greater than 300 nm
- The media and photoproducts should not absorb the incident light
- A general, high-yield synthetic procedure should exist for attaching the PPG to an unprotected substrate
- The protected substrate and the photoproducts should be easily separated

== Main classifications ==
=== Nitrobenzyl-based PPGs ===
==== Norrish Type II mechanism ====
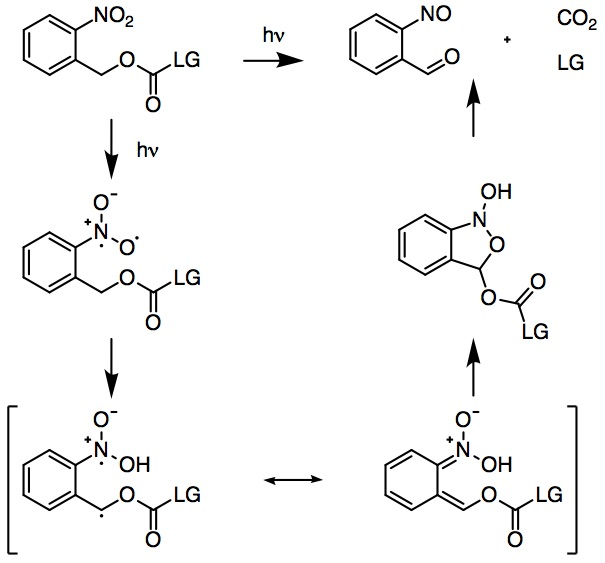
Figure 2. Norrish Type II mechanism for the photocleavage of a 2-nitrobenzyl-based PPG. The aci-nitro compound is drawn in the lower right.

Nitrobenzyl-based PPGs are often considered the most commonly used PPGs. These PPGs are traditionally identified as Norrish Type II reaction as their mechanism was first described by Norrish in 1935. Norrish elucidated that an incident photon (200 nm < λ < 320 nm) breaks the N=O π-bond in the nitro-group, bringing the protected substrate into a diradical excited state. Subsequently, the nitrogen radical abstracts a proton from the benzylic carbon, forming the aci-nitro compound. Depending on pH, solvent and the extent of substitution, the aci-nitro intermediate decays at a rate of roughly 10^{2}–10^{4} s^{−1}. Following resonance of the π-electrons, a five-membered ring is formed before the PPG is cleaved yielding 2-nitrosobenzaldehyde and a carboxylic acid.

Overall, nitrobenzyl-based PPGs are highly general. The list of functional groups that can be protected include, but are not limited to, phosphates, carboxylates, carbonates, carbamates, thiolates, phenolates and alkoxides. Additionally, while the rate varies with a number of variables, including choice of solvent and pH, the photodeprotection has been exhibited in both solution and in the solid-state. Under optimal conditions, the photorelease can proceed with >95% yield. Nevertheless, the photoproducts of this PPG are known to undergo imine formation when irradiated at wavelengths above 300 nm. This side product often competes for incident radiation, which may lead to decreased chemical and quantum yields.

==== Common modifications ====
In attempts to raise the chemical and quantum yields of nitrobenzyl-based PPGs, several beneficial modifications have been identified. The largest increase in quantum yield and reaction rate can be achieved through substitution at the benzylic carbon. However, potential substitutions must leave one hydrogen atom so the photodegradation can proceeded uninhibited.

Figure 3. A series of common nitrobenzyl-based PPGs.

Additional modifications have targeted the aromatic chromophore. Specifically, multiple studies have confirmed that the use of a 2,6-dinitrobenzyl PPG increases reaction yield. Additionally, depending on the leaving group, the presence of a second nitro-group may nearly quadruple the quantum yield (e.g. Φ = 0.033 to Φ = 0.12 when releasing a carbonate at 365 nm). While one may credit the increase in efficiency to the electronic effects of the second nitro group, this is not the case. Analogous systems with a 2-cyano-6-nitrobenzyl PPG exhibit similar electron-withdrawing effects, but do not provide such a large increase in efficiency. Therefore, the increase in efficiency is likely due to the increased probability of achieving the aci-nitro state; with two nitro groups, an incoming photon will be twice as likely to promote the compound into an excited state.

Finally, changing the excitation wavelength of the PPG may be advantageous. For example, if two PPGs have different excitation wavelengths one group may be removed while the other is left in place. To this end, several nitrobenzyl based PPGs display additional functionality. Common modifications include the use of 2-nitroveratryl (NV) or 6-nitropiperonylmethyl (NP). Both of these modifications induced red-shifting in the compounds' absorption spectra.

=== Carbonyl-based PPGs ===
==== Phenacyl PPGs ====
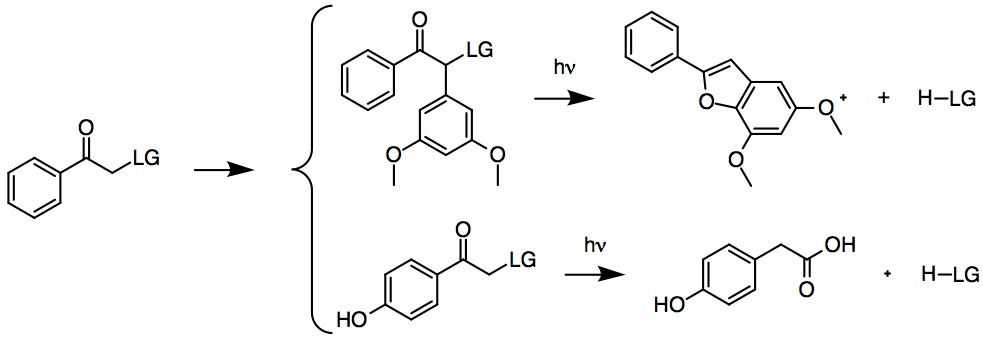
Figure 4. The standard phenacyl carbon skeleton (left) with two known modifications: 3',5'-dimethoxybenzonin (DMB, top right), and p-hydroxyphenacyl (bottom right).

The phenacyl PPG is the archetypal example of a carbonyl-based PPG. Under this motif, the PPG is attached to the protected substrate at the αβ-carbon, and can exhibit varied photodeprotection mechanisms based on the phenacyl skeleton, substrate identify and reaction conditions. Overall, phenacyl PPGs can be used to protect sulfonates, phosphates, carboxylates and carbamates.

As with nitrobenzyl-based PPGs, several modifications are known. For example, the 3',5'-dimethoxybenzoin PPG (DMB) contains a 3,5-dimethoxyphenyl substituent on the carbonyl's α-carbon. Under certain conditions, DMB has exhibited quantum yields as high as 0.64. Additionally, the p-hydroxyphenacyl PPG (pHP) has been designed to react through a photo-Favorskii rearrangement. This mechanism yields the carboxylic acid as the exclusive photoproduct; the key benefit of the pHP PPG is the lack of secondary photoreactions and the significantly different UV absorption profiles of the products and reactants. While the quantum yield of the p-hydroxyphenacyl PPG is generally in the 0.1-0.4 range, it can increase to near unity when releasing a good leaving group such as a tosylate. The photoextrusion of the leaving group from the pHP PPG is so effective, that it also releases even poor nucleofuges such as amines (with the quantum yield in the 0.01-0.5 range, and dependent on solution pH). The Additionally, photorelease occurs on the nanosecond timeframe, with k_{release} > 10^{8} s^{−1}. The o-hydroxyphenacyl PPG has been introduced as an alternative with absorption band shifted closer towards the visible region, however it has slightly lower quantum yields of deprotection (generally 0.1-0.3) due to excited state proton transfer available as an alternative deactivation pathway.

The phenacyl moiety itself contains one chiral carbon atom in the backbone. The protected group (leaving group) is not directly attached to this chiral carbon atom, however has been shown to be able to work as a chiral auxiliary directing approach of a diene to a dienophile in a stereoselective thermal Diels–Alder reaction. The auxiliary is then removed simply upon irradiation with UV light.

==== Photoenolization through γ-hydrogen abstraction ====
Another family of carbonyl-based PPGs exists that is structurally like the phenacyl motif, but which reacts through a separate mechanism. As the name suggests, these PPGs react through abstraction of the carbonyl's γ-hydrogen. The compound is then able to undergo a photoenolization, which is mechanistically like a keto-enol tautomerization. From the enol form, the compound can finally undergo a ground-state transformation that releases the substrate. The quantum yield of this mechanism directly corresponds to the ability of the protected substrate to be a good leaving group. For good leaving groups, the rate-determining step is either hydrogen abstraction or isomerization; however, if the substrate is a poor leaving group, release is the rate-determining step.

=== Benzyl-based PPGs ===
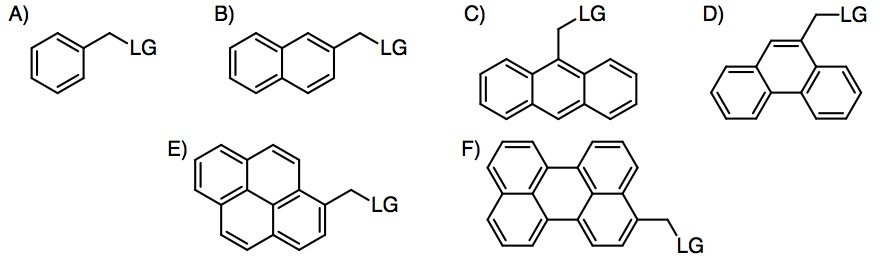
Figure 5: Benzyl-based PPGs with polycyclic aromatic cores: A) benzene; B) naphthalene; C) anthracene; D) phenanthrene; E) phyene and; F) perylene.

Barltrop and Schofield first demonstrated the use of a benzyl-based PPG, structural variations have focused on substitution to the benzene ring, as well as extension of the aromatic core. For example, insertion of a m,m'-dimethoxy substituent was shown to increase the chemical yield ~75% due to what has been termed the "excited state meta effect." However, this substitution is only able to release good leaving groups such as carbamates and carboxylates. Additionally, the addition of an o-hydroxy group enables the release of alcohols, phenols and carboxylic acids due to the proximity of the phenolic hydroxy to the benzylic leaving group. Finally, the carbon skeleton has been expanded to include PPGs based on naphthalene, anthracene, phenanthrene, pyrene and perylene cores, resulting in varied chemical and quantum yields, as well as irradiation wavelengths and times.

== Applications ==
=== Use in total synthesis ===
Despite their many advantages, the use of PPGs in total syntheses are relatively rare. Nevertheless, PPGs' "orthogonality" to common synthetic reagents, as well as the possibility of conducting a "traceless reagent process", has proven useful in natural product synthesis. Two examples include the syntheses of ent-Fumiquinazoline and (-)-diazonamide A. The syntheses required irradiation at 254 and 300 nm, respectively.

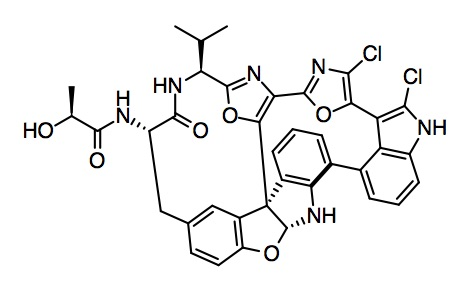
Figure 7. The total synthesis of (-)-diazonamide A (above) requires the use of PPGs.

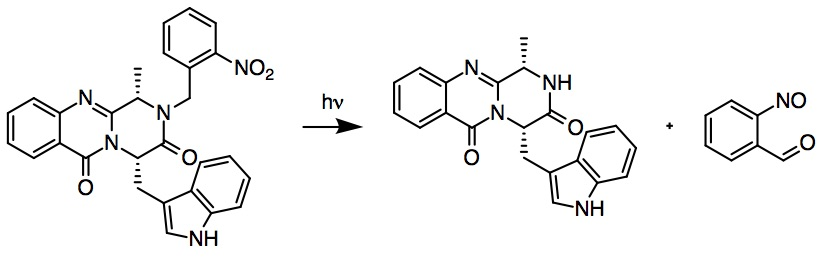
Figure 6. The final step in Busuyek's synthesis of ent-Fumiquinazoline is the removal of a 2-nitrobenzyl PPG through a Norrish Type II mechanism.

=== Photocaging ===
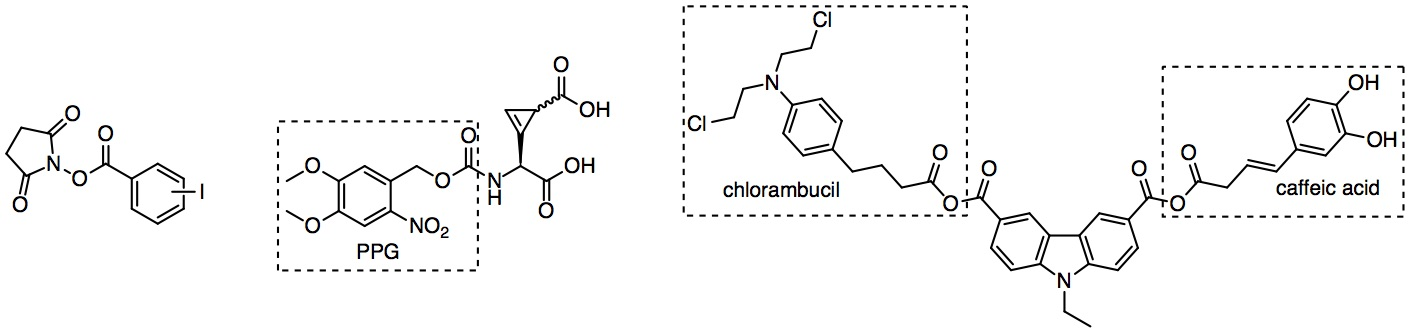
Figure 8. A photocaged reagent, neurotransmitter, and therapeutic from left to right, respectively.

Protecting a substrate with a PPG is commonly referred to as "photocaging." This term is especially popular in biological systems. For example, Ly et al. developed a p-iodobenzoate-based photocaged reagent, which would experience a homolytic photoclevage of the C-I bond. They found that the reaction could occur with excellent yields, and with a half-life of 2.5 minutes when a 15 W 254 nm light source was used. The resulting biomolecular radicals are necessary in many enzymatic processes. As a second example, researchers synthesized a cycloprene-modified glutamate photocaged with a 2-nitroveratrol-based PPG. As it is an excitatory amino acid neurotransmitter, the aim was to develop a bioorthagonal probe for glutamate in vivo. In a final example, Venkatesh et al. demonstrated the use of a PPG-based photocaged therapeutic. Their prodrug, which released one equivalent of caffeic acid and chlorambucil upon phototriggering, showed reasonable biocompatibility, cellular uptake and photoregulared drug release in vitro.

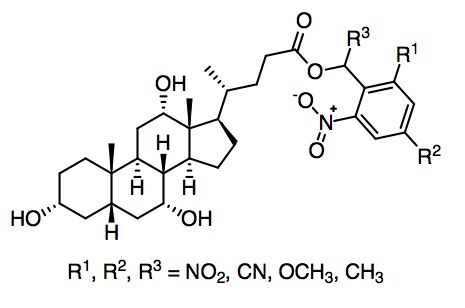
Figure 9. Many of the photoresists developed at Bell Laboratories centered around the 2-nitrobenzyl cholate motif.

=== Photoresists ===
During the 1980s, AT&T Bell Laboratories explored the use of nitrobenzyl-based PPGs as photoresists. Over the course of the decade, they developed a deep UV positive-tone photoresist where the protected substrate was added to a copolymer of poly(methyl methacrylate) and poly(methacrylic acid). Initially, the blend was insoluble. However, upon exposure to 260 ± 20 nm light, the PPG would be removed yielding 2-nitrosobenzaldehyde and a carboxylic acid that was soluble in aqueous base.

=== Surface modification ===
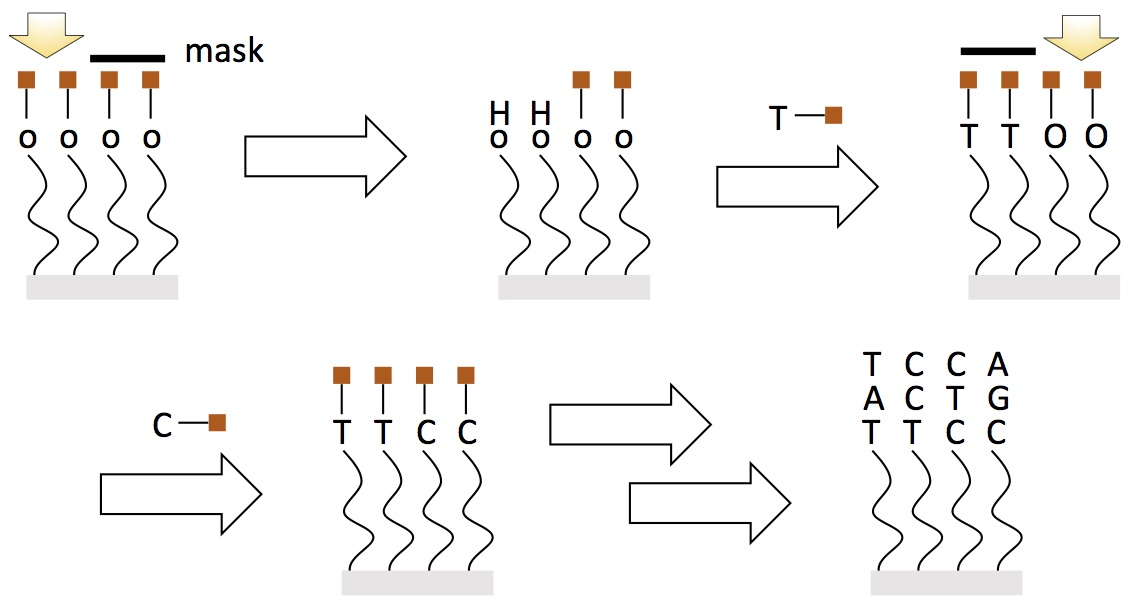
Figure 10. Schematic of light directed polynucleotide synthesis on surfaces.

When covalently attached to a surface, PPGs do not exhibit any surface-induced properties (i.e. they behave like PPGs in solution, and do not exhibit any new properties because of their proximity to a surface). Consequently, PPGs can be patterned on a surface and removed in manner analogous to lithography to create a multifunctionalized surface. This process was first reported by Solas in 1991; protected nucleotides were attached to a surface and spatially-resolved single stranded polynucleotides were generated in a step-wise "grafting from" method. In separate studies, there have been multiple reports of using PPGs to enable the selective separation of blocks within block-copolymers to expose fresh surfaces. Furthermore, this surface patterning method has since been extended to proteins. Caged etching agents (such as hydrogen fluoride protected with 4-hydroxyphenacyl) allows to etch only surfaces exposed to light.

=== Gels ===
Various PPGs, often featuring the 2-nitrobenzyl motif, have been used to generate numerous gels. In one example, researchers incorporated PPGs into a silica-based sol-gel. In a second example, a hydrogel was synthesized to include protected Ca^{2+} ions. Finally, PPGs have been utilized to cross-link numerous photodegradable polymers, which have featured linear, multi-dimensional network, dendrimer, and branched structures.
