= Phenacyl group =

Functional group

Structure of a compound containing a phenacyl group

In organic chemistry, a phenacyl group is an aromatic substituent that consists of a phenyl group attached to an acyl group. A molecule containing a phenacyl group has the formula RCH_{2}(CO)C_{6}H_{5} and the structure shown to the right. Here, R denotes the remainder of the molecule; for instance, if R is Br, then the compound could be called "phenacyl bromide". Note however that in the standard IUPAC nomenclature this compound would instead be called "2-bromo-1-phenylethanone".

== Examples ==
- Phenacyl chloride is also known as CN gas.
- Phenacyl bromide, a toxic chemical mainly used in the production of other chemicals.
- N-phenacyl thiazolium bromide, a compound that breaks cross-links in Advanced glycation end products.
