= 3-Deoxyglucosone =

Names
- IUPAC name 3-Deoxy-D-erythro-hexos-2-ulose
- Systematic IUPAC name (4S,5R)-4,5,6-Trihydroxy-2-oxohexanal
- Other names 3-Deoxy-D-erythro-hexosulose; 2-Keto-3-deoxyglucose; 3-Deoxy-D-erythro-hexosulose; 3-Deoxy-D-glucosone; D-3-Deoxyglucosone

Identifiers
CAS Number	4084-27-9
3D model (JSmol)	Interactive image; Interactive image
ChEBI	CHEBI:60777
ChemSpider	102799
ECHA InfoCard	100.241.539
PubChem CID	114839
UNII	EXV5374VEY
CompTox Dashboard (EPA)	DTXSID00193820
- InChI: InChI=1S/C6H10O5/c7-2-4(9)1-5(10)6(11)3-8/h2,5-6,8,10-11H,1,3H2/t5-,6+/m0/s1 Key: ZGCHLOWZNKRZSN-NTSWFWBYSA-N; InChI=1/C6H10O5/c7-2-4(9)1-5(10)6(11)3-8/h2,5-6,8,10-11H,1,3H2/t5-,6+/m0/s1 Key: ZGCHLOWZNKRZSN-NTSWFWBYBM
- SMILES: C(C(C(CO)O)O)C(=O)C=O; O=C(C=O)C[C@H](O)[C@H](O)CO

Properties
Chemical formula	C_{6}H_{10}O_{5}
Molar mass	162.141 g·mol^{−1}
Density	1.406 g/ml
- Except where otherwise noted, data are given for materials in their standard state (at 25 °C [77 °F], 100 kPa). verify (what is ?) Infobox references

3-Deoxyglucosone (3DG) is a sugar that is notable because it is a marker for diabetes. 3DG reacts with protein to form advanced glycation end-products (AGEs), which contribute to diseases such as the vascular complications of diabetes, atherosclerosis, hypertension, Alzheimer's disease, inflammation, and aging.

== Biosynthesis ==
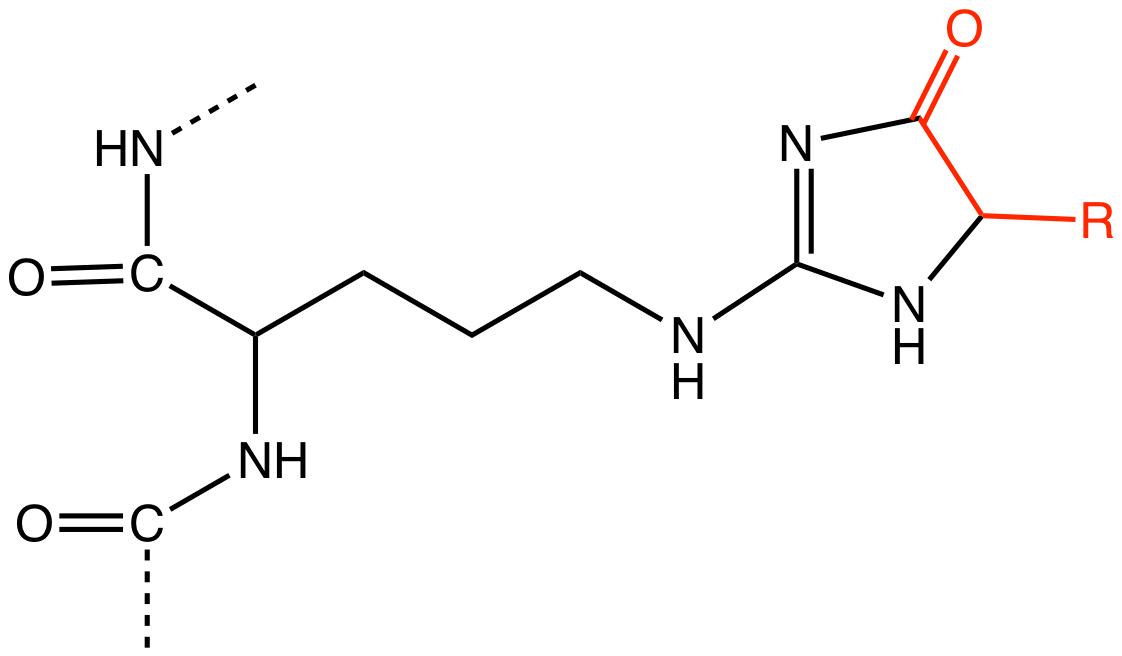
4-Imidazolone arise from the condensation of arginine residues and 3-deoxyglucosone (R = CH_{2}CH(OH)CH(OH)CH_{2}OH).

3DG is made naturally via the Maillard reaction. It forms after glucose reacts with primary amino groups of lysine or arginine found in proteins. Because of the increased concentration of the reactant glucose, more 3DG forms with excessive blood sugar levels, as in uncontrolled diabetes. Glucose reacts non-enzymatically with protein amino groups to initiate glycation. The formation of 3DG may account for the numerous complications of diabetes as well as aging.

3DG arises also via the degradation of fructose 3-phosphate (F3P). 3DG plays a central role in the development of diabetic complications via the action of fructosamine-3-kinase.

== Biochemistry ==
As a dicarbonyl sugar, i.e. one with the grouping R-C(O)-C(O)-R, 3DG is highly reactive toward amine groups. Amines are common in amino acids as well as some nucleic acids. The products from the reaction of 3DG with protein amino groups are called advanced glycation end-products (AGEs). AGEs include imidazolones, pyrraline, N^{6}-(carboxymethyl)lysine, and pentosidine. 3DG as well as AGEs play a role in the modification and cross-linking of long-lived proteins such as crystallin and collagen, contributing to diseases such as the vascular complications of diabetes, atherosclerosis, hypertension, Alzheimer's disease, inflammation, and aging.

3DG has a variety of potential biological effects, particularly when it is present at elevated concentrations in diabetic states:

- Diabetics with nephropathy were found to have elevated plasma levels of 3DG compared with other diabetics.
- Glycated diet, which elevates systemic 3DG levels, leads to diabetes-like tubular and glomerular kidney pathology.
- Increased 3DG is correlated to increased glomerular basement membrane width.
- 3DG inactivates aldehyde reductase. Aldehyde reductase is the cellular enzyme that protects the body from 3DG. Detoxification of 3DG to 3-deoxyfructose (3DF) is impaired in diabetic humans since their ratio of 3DG to 3DF in urine and plasma differs significantly from non-diabetic individuals.
- 3DG is a teratogenic factor in diabetic embryopathy, leading to embryo malformation. This appears to arise from 3DG accumulation, which leads to superoxide-mediated embryopathy. Women with pre-existing diabetes or severe diabetes that develops during pregnancy are between 3 and 4 times more likely than other women to give birth to infants with birth defects.
- 3DG induces apoptosis in macrophage-derived cell lines and is toxic to cultured cortical neurons and PC12 cells.

=== 3DG and ROS ===
3DG induces reactive oxygen species (ROS) that contribute to the development of diabetic complications. Specifically, 3DG induces heparin-binding epidermal growth factor, a smooth muscle mitogen that is abundant in atherosclerotic plaques. This observation suggests that an increase in 3DG may trigger atherogenesis in diabetes. 3DG also inactivates some enzymes that protect cells from ROS. For example, glutathione peroxidase, a central antioxidant enzyme that uses glutathione to remove ROS, and glutathione reductase, which regenerates glutathione, are both inactivated by 3DG. Diabetic humans show increased oxidative stress. 3DG-induced ROS result in oxidative DNA damage. 3DG can be internalized by cells and internalized 3DG is responsible for the production of intracellular oxidative stress.

=== Detoxification ===
Although of uncertain medical significance, a variety of compounds react with 3DG, possibly deactivating it. One such agent is aminoguanidine (AG). AG reduces AGE associated retinal, neural, arterial, and renal pathologies in animal models. The problem with AG is that it is toxic in the quantities needed for efficacy.

== Additional reading ==
- Delpierre G, Rider MH, Collard F, Stroobant V, Vanstapel F, Santos H, Van Schaftingen E (October 2000). "Identification, cloning, and heterologous expression of a mammalian fructosamine-3-kinase". Diabetes. 49 (10): 1627–34. doi:10.2337/diabetes.49.10.1627. hdl:2078.1/8652. PMID 11016445.
- Baynes JW, Thorpe SR, Murtiashaw MH (1984). "[8] Nonenzymatic glucosylation of lysine residues in albumin". Nonenzymatic glucosylation of lysine residues in albumin. Methods in Enzymology. Vol. 106. pp. 88–98. doi:10.1016/0076-6879(84)06010-9. ISBN 978-0-12-182006-0. PMID 6436646.
- Dyer DG, Blackledge JA, Thorpe SR, Baynes JW (June 1991). "Formation of pentosidine during nonenzymatic browning of proteins by glucose. Identification of glucose and other carbohydrates as possible precursors of pentosidine in vivo". The Journal of Biological Chemistry. 266 (18): 11654–60. doi:10.1016/S0021-9258(18)99007-1. PMID 1904867.
- Rahbar S, Kumar Yernini K, Scott S, Gonzales N, Lalezari I (September 1999). "Novel inhibitors of advanced glycation endproducts". Biochemical and Biophysical Research Communications. 262 (3): 651–6. Bibcode:1999BBRC..262..651R. doi:10.1006/bbrc.1999.1275. PMID 10471380.
- Yan SF, Ramasamy R, Naka Y, Schmidt AM (December 2003). "Glycation, inflammation, and RAGE: a scaffold for the macrovascular complications of diabetes and beyond". Circulation Research. 93 (12): 1159–69. doi:10.1161/01.RES.0000103862.26506.3D. PMID 14670831.*
