= Alteon =

Alteon may refer to:

- Alteon Inc., initial developers of Alagebrium
- Alteon Training, an aircraft training school owned by The Boeing Company
- Alteon WebSystems, a network products manufacturer
