= Aminoimidazolase =

Class of enzymes

Identifiers
- EC no.: 3.5.4.8
- CAS no.: 9025-17-6

Databases
- BRENDA: enzyme data
- ExPASy: NiceZyme view
- KEGG: enzyme entry
- MetaCyc: metabolic pathway
- Rhea: reactions
- PDB structures: RCSB PDB PDBe PDBsum
- Gene Ontology: AmiGO / QuickGO
Search
- PMC: articles
- PubMed: articles
- NCBI: proteins

Aminoimidazolase (EC 3.5.4.8) is an enzyme characterised from Clostridium cylindrosporum and Methanococcus vannielii that catalyzes the hydrolysis of 4-aminoimidazole to imidazolone and ammonia:

4-aminoimidazole
H_{2}O
NH_{3}
imidazolone

N-formimidoylglycine

The reaction is part of the breakdown of the purine, xanthine, and the product imidazolone can be further converted to N-formimidoylglycine.

This enzyme is a hydrolase, one acting on carbon-nitrogen bonds other than peptide bonds, specifically in cyclic amidines. The systematic name of this enzyme class is 4-aminoimidazole aminohydrolase. This enzyme is also called 4-aminoimidazole hydrolase. It uses iron as a cofactor.
