= Pentosidine =

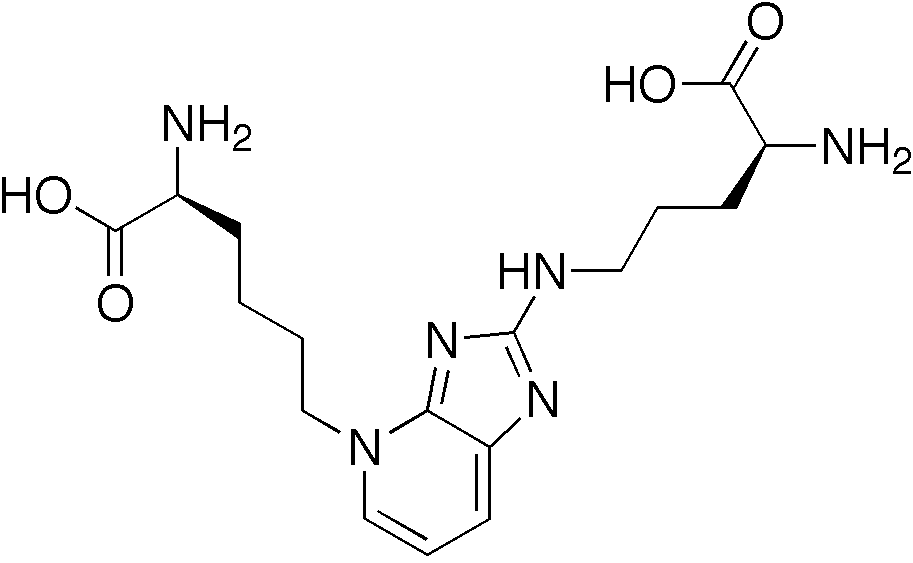

Names
- Systematic IUPAC name (2S)-2-Amino-6-(2-{[(4S)-4-amino-4-carboxybutyl]amino}-4H-imidazo[4,5-b]pyridin-4-yl)hexanoic acid

Identifiers
CAS Number	124505-87-9
3D model (JSmol)	Interactive image
ChEBI	CHEBI:59951
ChemSpider	106787
PubChem CID	119593
UNII	BJ4I2X2CQJ
CompTox Dashboard (EPA)	DTXSID60154417
- InChI: InChI=1S/C17H26N6O4/c18-11(15(24)25)5-1-2-9-23-10-4-7-13-14(23)22-17(21-13)20-8-3-6-12(19)16(26)27/h4,7,10-12H,1-3,5-6,8-9,18-19H2,(H,20,21)(H,24,25)(H,26,27)/t11-,12-/m0/s1 Key: AYEKKSTZQYEZPU-RYUDHWBXSA-N; InChI=1/C17H26N6O4/c18-11(15(24)25)5-1-2-9-23-10-4-7-13-14(23)22-17(21-13)20-8-3-6-12(19)16(26)27/h4,7,10-12H,1-3,5-6,8-9,18-19H2,(H,20,21)(H,24,25)(H,26,27)/t11-,12-/m0/s1 Key: AYEKKSTZQYEZPU-RYUDHWBXBF
- SMILES: C1=CN(C2=NC(=NC2=C1)NCCC[C@@H](C(=O)O)N)CCCC[C@@H](C(=O)O)N

Properties
Chemical formula	C_{17}H_{26}N_{6}O_{4}
Molar mass	378.433 g·mol^{−1}
Density	1.47 g/cm^{3}

Related compounds
Related AGEs	Glucosepane
Related compounds	Arginine; Lysine
- Except where otherwise noted, data are given for materials in their standard state (at 25 °C [77 °F], 100 kPa). verify (what is ?) Infobox references

Pentosidine is a biomarker for advanced glycation endproducts, or AGEs. It is a well characterized and easily detected member of this large class of compounds.

== Background ==
AGEs are biochemicals formed continuously under normal circumstances, but more rapidly under a variety of stresses, especially oxidative stress and hyperglycemia. They serve as markers of stress and act as toxins themselves. Pentosidine is typical of the class, except that it fluoresces, which allows it to be seen and measured easily. Because it is well characterized, it is often studied to provide new insight into the biochemistry of AGE compounds in general.

== Biochemistry ==
Derived from ribose, a pentose, pentosidine forms fluorescent cross-links between the arginine and lysine residues in collagen. It is formed in a reaction of the amino acids with the Maillard reaction products of ribose.

Although it is present only in trace concentrations among tissue proteins, it is useful for assessing cumulative damage to proteins—advanced glycation endproducts—by non-enzymatic browning reactions with carbohydrates.

== Physiology ==
In vivo, AGEs form pentosidine through sugar fragmentation. In patients with diabetes mellitus type 2, pentosidine correlates with the presence and severity of diabetic complications.
