= Fructoselysine-6-kinase =

Fructoselysine-6-kinase (sometimes also called fructoselysine kinase) is a kinase enzyme.

It phosphorylates fructoselysine on the fructose residue's 6-carbon to form fructoselysine-6-phosphate, as the first step to breaking it down to glucose-6-phosphate and lysine for use as a food source. The second step is accomplished by the enzyme fructoselysine-6-phosphate deglycase.

In E. coli, both enzymes are located on the frl (fructoselysine) operon in order to be transcribed simultaneously. In this context it is known as gene 'frlD' and fructoselysine 6-phosphate deglycase as 'frlB'.
