= Fructoselysine =

Names
- IUPAC name N^{6}-(1-Deoxy-D-fructos-1-yl)-L-lysine
- Systematic IUPAC name (2S)-2-Amino-6-{[(3S,4R,5R)-3,4,5,6-tetrahydroxy-2-oxohexyl]amino}hexanoic acid
- Other names Fructosyllysine; ε-Fructosyl-L-lysine

Identifiers
CAS Number	21291-40-7
3D model (JSmol)	Interactive image
ChemSpider	8015298
PubChem CID	9839580
UNII	F2RDS6J0Y0
- InChI: InChI=1S/C12H24N2O7/c13-7(12(20)21)3-1-2-4-14-5-8(16)10(18)11(19)9(17)6-15/h7,9-11,14-15,17-19H,1-6,13H2,(H,20,21)/t7-,9+,10+,11+/m0/s1 Key: BFSYFTQDGRDJNV-AYHFEMFVSA-N
- SMILES: C(CCNCC(=O)[C@H]([C@@H]([C@@H](CO)O)O)O)C[C@@H](C(=O)O)N

Properties
Chemical formula	C_{12}H_{24}N_{2}O_{7}
Molar mass	308.331 g·mol^{−1}
- Except where otherwise noted, data are given for materials in their standard state (at 25 °C [77 °F], 100 kPa). Infobox references

Fructoselysine is an Amadori adduct of glucose to lysine.

It breaks down into furosine on acid-catalysed hydrolysis. E. coli breaks it down using the enzymes fructoselysine-6-kinase and fructoselysine 6-phosphate deglycase into glucose 6-phosphate and lysine, a set of enzymes located on the frl (fructoselysine) operon.
