= Glyoxal =

Skeletal formula of glyoxal
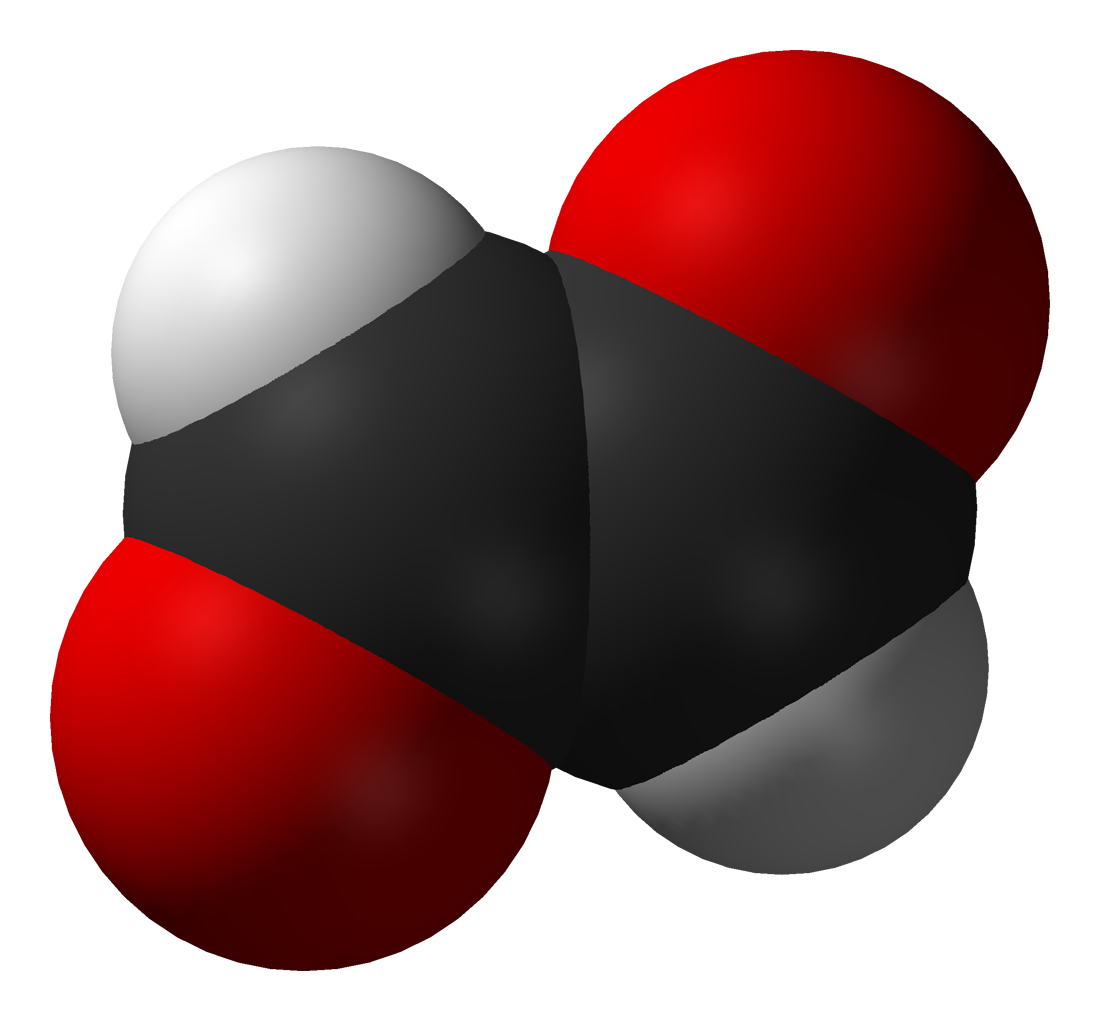
Space-filling model of glyox

Names
- IUPAC name Glyoxal
- Preferred IUPAC name Ethanedial
- Other names Glyoxaldehyde; Oxalaldehyde; Oxaldehyde; Ethanedialdehyde

Identifiers
CAS Number	107-22-2
3D model (JSmol)	Interactive image
ChEBI	CHEBI:34779
ChemSpider	7572
ECHA InfoCard	100.003.160
KEGG	C14448
PubChem CID	7860
UNII	50NP6JJ975
CompTox Dashboard (EPA)	DTXSID5025364
- InChI: InChI=1S/C2H2O2/c3-1-2-4/h1-2H Key: LEQAOMBKQFMDFZ-UHFFFAOYSA-N; InChI=1/C2H2O2/c3-1-2-4/h1-2H Key: LEQAOMBKQFMDFZ-UHFFFAOYAX
- SMILES: O=CC=O

Properties
Chemical formula	C_{2}H_{2}O_{2}
Molar mass	58.036 g·mol^{−1}
Melting point	15 °C (59 °F; 288 K)
Boiling point	51 °C (124 °F; 324 K)

Thermochemistry
Heat capacity (C)	1.044 J/(K·g)

Hazards
NFPA 704 (fire diamond)	2 1 1
Flash point	−4 °C (25 °F; 269 K)
Autoignition temperature	285 °C (545 °F; 558 K)

Related compounds
Related aldehydes	acetaldehyde glycolaldehyde propanedial methylglyoxal
Related compounds	glyoxylic acid glycolic acid oxalic acid pyruvic acid diacetyl acetylacetone
- Except where otherwise noted, data are given for materials in their standard state (at 25 °C [77 °F], 100 kPa). verify (what is ?) Infobox references

Glyoxal is an organic compound with the chemical formula OCHCHO. It is the smallest dialdehyde (a compound with two aldehyde groups). It is a crystalline solid, white at low temperatures and yellow near the melting point (15 °C). The liquid is yellow, and the vapor is green.

Pure glyoxal is not commonly encountered; glyoxal is usually handled as a 40% aqueous solution (density near 1.24 g/mL). It forms a series of hydrates, including oligomers. For many purposes, these hydrated oligomers behave equivalently to glyoxal. Glyoxal is produced industrially as a precursor to many products.

== Production ==
Glyoxal was first prepared and named by the German-British chemist Heinrich Debus (1824–1915) by reacting ethanol with nitric acid.

Commercial glyoxal is prepared either by the gas-phase oxidation of ethylene glycol in the presence of a silver or copper catalyst (the Laporte process) or by the liquid-phase oxidation of acetaldehyde with nitric acid.

The first commercial glyoxal source was in Lamotte, France, started in 1960. The single largest commercial source is BASF in Ludwigshafen, Germany, at around 60,000 tons per year. Other production sites exist also in the US and China. Commercial bulk glyoxal is made and reported as a 40% solution in water by weight (approx. 1:5 molar ratio of glyoxal to water).

=== Laboratory methods ===
Glyoxal may be synthesized in the laboratory by oxidation of acetaldehyde with selenious acid or by ozonolysis of benzene.

Anhydrous glyoxal is prepared by heating solid glyoxal hydrate(s) with phosphorus pentoxide and condensing the vapors in a cold trap.

== Properties ==
The experimentally determined Henry's law constant of glyoxal is:

$K_\text{H} = 4.19 \times 10^5 \times \exp\left[\frac{6.22\times10^4 \,\text{J}\,\text{mol}^{-1}}{R}\times \left( \frac1T - \frac{1}{298\,\text{K}}\right)\right] \,\text{M}\,\text{atm}^{-1}.$

== Biochemistry ==
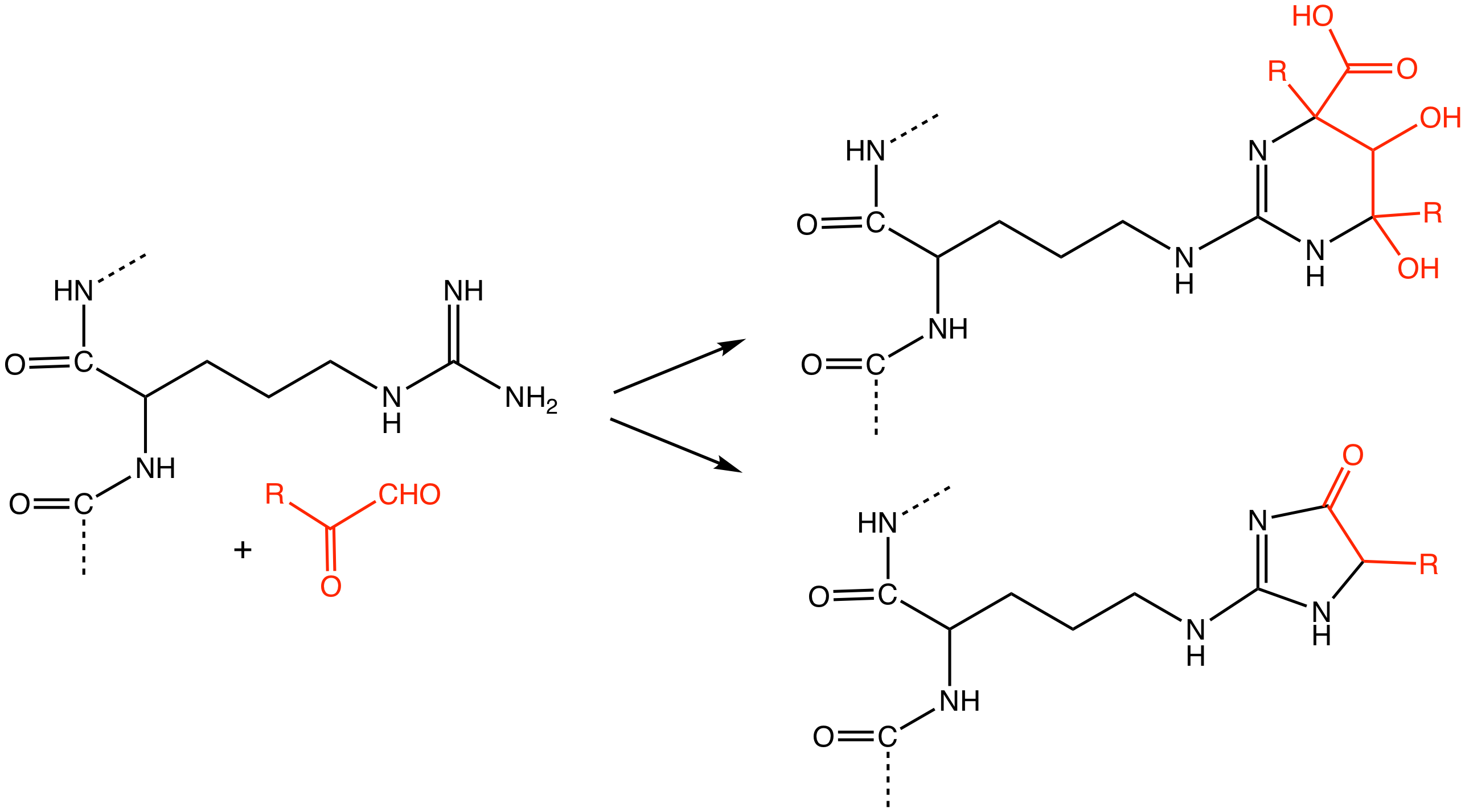
Glycation often entails the modification of the guanidine group of arginine residues with glyoxal (R = H), methylglyoxal (R = Me), and 3-deoxyglucosone, which arise from the metabolism of high-carbohydrate diets. Thus modified, these proteins contribute to complications from diabetes.

Advanced glycation end-products (AGEs) are proteins or lipids that become glycated as the result of a high-sugar diet. They are a bio-marker implicated in aging and the development, or worsening, of many degenerative diseases, such as diabetes, atherosclerosis, chronic kidney disease, and Alzheimer's disease.

Guanine bases in DNA can undergo non-enzymatic glycation by glyoxal to form glyoxal-guanine adducts. These adducts may then produce DNA crosslinks. Glycation of DNA may also lead to mutation, breaks in DNA and cytotoxicity. In humans, glyoxal-glycated nucleotides can be repaired by the protein DJ-1 also known as Park7.

== Applications ==
Coated paper and textile finishes use large amounts of glyoxal as a crosslinker for starch-based formulations. It condenses with urea to afford 4,5-dihydroxy-2-imidazolidinone, which further reacts with formaldehyde to give the bis(hydroxymethyl) derivative dimethylol ethylene urea, which is used for wrinkle-resistant chemical treatments of clothing, i.e. permanent press.

Glyoxal is used as a solubilizer and cross-linking agent in polymer chemistry.

Glyoxal is a valuable building block in organic synthesis, especially in the synthesis of heterocycles such as imidazoles. A convenient form of the reagent for use in the laboratory is its bis(hemiacetal) with ethylene glycol, 1,4-dioxane-2,3-diol. This compound is commercially available.

Glyoxal solutions can also be used as a fixative for histology, that is, a method of preserving cells for examining them under a microscope.

== Structure ==
As a gas, glyoxal exists as a monomer. In solution and in the absence of hydroxyl-containing species, glyoxal converts to a white polymer of unknown structure.

=== Speciation in solution ===
Hydrated glyoxal (top) and derived oligomers, called dimers and trimers. The middle and lower species exist as mixtures of isomers.

Glyoxal is supplied typically as a 40% aqueous solution. Like other small aldehydes, glyoxal forms hydrates. Furthermore, the hydrates condense to give a series of oligomers, some of which remain of uncertain structure. For most applications, the exact nature of the species in solution is inconsequential. At least one hydrate of glyoxal is sold commercially, glyoxal trimer dihydrate: [(CHO)_{2}]_{3}(H_{2}O)_{2} (CAS 4405-13-4). Other glyoxal equivalents are available, such as the ethylene glycol hemiacetal 1,4-dioxane-trans-2,3-diol (CAS 4845-50-5, m.p. 91–95 °C).

It is estimated that, at concentrations less than 1 M, glyoxal exists predominantly as the monomer or hydrates thereof, i.e., OCHCHO, OCHCH(OH)_{2}, or (HO)_{2}CHCH(OH)_{2}. At concentrations above 1 M, dimers predominate. These dimers are probably dioxolanes, with the formula [(HO)CH]_{2}O_{2}CHCHO. Dimer and trimers precipitate as solids from cold solutions.

== Other occurrences ==
Glyoxal has been observed as a trace gas in the atmosphere, e.g. as an oxidation product of hydrocarbons. Tropospheric concentrations of 0–200 ppt by volume have been reported, in polluted regions up to 1 ppb by volume.

== Safety ==
The LD_{50} (oral, rats) is 3.3 g/kg, when that of common salt is 3 g/kg.
