= Alagebrium =

Chemical compound

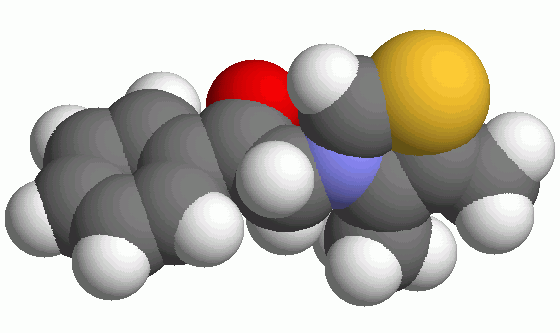

Clinical data
- ATC code: none

Identifiers
- IUPAC name: 4,5-dimethyl-3-(2-oxo-2-phenylethyl)-thiazolium chloride
- CAS Number: 393121-34-1; as chloride: 341028-37-3
- PubChem CID: 216306
- ChemSpider: 187495
- UNII: DGH49JXB1F; as chloride: 79QS8K2877
- ChEMBL: ChEMBL2107309
- CompTox Dashboard (EPA): DTXSID60955648
- ECHA InfoCard: 100.164.267

Chemical and physical data
- Formula: C_{13}H_{14}ClNOS
- Molar mass: 267.77 g·mol^{−1}
- 3D model (JSmol): Interactive image
- SMILES: [Cl-].O=C(c1ccccc1)C[n+]2c(c(sc2)C)C
- InChI: InChI=1S/C13H14NOS.ClH/c1-10-11(2)16-9-14(10)8-13(15)12-6-4-3-5-7-12;/h3-7,9H,8H2,1-2H3;1H/q+1;/p-1; Key:MKOMESMZHZNBIZ-UHFFFAOYSA-M

Alagebrium (formerly known as ALT-711, dimethyl-3-N-phenacylthiazolium chloride) was a drug candidate developed by Alteon, Inc. It was the first drug candidate to be clinically tested for the purpose of breaking the crosslinks caused by advanced glycation endproducts (AGEs), thereby reversing one of the main mechanisms of aging. Through this effect alagebrium is designed to reverse the stiffening of blood vessel walls that contributes to hypertension and cardiovascular disease, as well as many other forms of degradation associated with protein crosslinking. Alagebrium has proven effective in reducing systolic blood pressure and providing therapeutic benefit for patients with diastolic heart failure.

== Mechanism ==
Advanced glycation end-products (AGEs) are proteins that become glycated as a result of exposure to sugars. They are a bio-marker implicated in aging and the development, or worsening, of many degenerative diseases, such as diabetes, atherosclerosis, chronic kidney disease, and Alzheimer's disease. Pharmacologic intervention with alagebrium directly targets the biochemical pathway leading to AGEs. Although alagebrium may break some important AGE crosslinks, there is no evidence that it is effective against the most prevalent crosslink: glucosepane.

== History ==
Alteon said that it had selected ALT-711 as its lead AGE-breaker based on preclinical results in its annual report for the year 1997 and that it was preparing an IND filing.

The INN name was proposed in 2004 and recommended in 2005.

In 2006 Alteon merged with a company called HaptoGuard that had cash and a potential diagnostic test for haptoglobin; as part of the merger Genentech, which held preferred shares in Alteon, converted their shares to common ones and received the right to get milestone payments and royalties on sales of alagebrium, and option rights to license ALT-2074. In 2007, the company changed its name to Synvista Therapeutics, Inc. Synvista announced that it was terminating clinical trials of alagebrium in January 2009 in order to focus on the diagnostic test and another clinical candidate SYI-2074 (formerly ALT-2074). The company seems to have discontinued operations and their website is no longer available.

== See also ==
- Glycation
- Glycosylation
- Glucosepane
- Advanced glycation end product
