= N-Phenacylthiazolium bromide =

Names
- Preferred IUPAC name 3-(2-Oxo-2-phenylethyl)-1,3-thiazol-3-ium bromide

Identifiers
CAS Number	5304-34-7
3D model (JSmol)	Interactive image
ChemSpider	7990117
MeSH	C101705
PubChem CID	9814367
UNII	JE6JEU5BW6
CompTox Dashboard (EPA)	DTXSID30431106
- InChI: InChI=1S/C11H10NOS.BrH/c13-11(8-12-6-7-14-9-12)10-4-2-1-3-5-10;/h1-7,9H,8H2;1H/q+1;/p-1 Key: CEAFABGKSOIJLH-UHFFFAOYSA-M
- SMILES: C1=CC=C(C=C1)C(=O)C[N+]2=CSC=C2.[Br-]

Properties
Chemical formula	C_{11}H_{10}BrNOS
Molar mass	284.17 g·mol^{−1}
- Except where otherwise noted, data are given for materials in their standard state (at 25 °C [77 °F], 100 kPa). Infobox references

N-Phenacylthiazolium bromide (PTB) is a cross-link breaker that in one study has been shown to prevent vascular advanced glycation end-product accumulation in diabetic rats.
