= N(6)-Carboxymethyllysine =

- Stereo, skeletal formula of N(6)-carboxymethyllysine (S)

Names
- IUPAC name N^{6}-(Carboxymethyl)-L-lysine
- Systematic IUPAC name (2S)-2-Amino-6-[(carboxymethyl)amino]hexanoic acid

Identifiers
CAS Number	5746-04-3 S
3D model (JSmol)	Interactive image
Beilstein Reference	4989963 S
ChEBI	CHEBI:53014
ChemSpider	11217184; 110350 S; 21467765 R
MeSH	N(6)-carboxymethyllysine
PubChem CID	15691192; 26175690 R; 123800 S
UNII	70YDX3Z2O7
CompTox Dashboard (EPA)	DTXSID80904133
- InChI: InChI=1S/C8H16N2O4/c9-6(8(13)14)3-1-2-4-10-5-7(11)12/h6,10H,1-5,9H2,(H,11,12)(H,13,14) Key: NUXSIDPKKIEIMI-UHFFFAOYSA-N
- SMILES: NC(CCCCNCC(=O)O)C(=O)O

Properties
Chemical formula	C_{8}H_{16}N_{2}O_{4}
Molar mass	204.226 g·mol^{−1}

Related compounds
Related alkanoic acids	gamma-Glutamylcysteine
- Except where otherwise noted, data are given for materials in their standard state (at 25 °C [77 °F], 100 kPa). verify (what is ?) Infobox references

N(6)-Carboxymethyllysine (CML), also known as N^{ε}-(carboxymethyl)lysine, is an advanced glycation endproduct (AGE). CML has been the most used marker for AGEs in food analysis.

Recently, it has been demonstrated that gut microbiota mediates an aging-associated decline in gut barrier function, allowing AGEs to leak into the bloodstream from the gut and impairing microglial function in the brain. It is suggested that the amount of CML in human blood samples may correlate with age.

A humanized monoclonal antibody which binds to N6 – carboxymethyl lysine shows considerable promise as a possible therapeutic agent for treating pancreatic cancer.
