= Imazapyr =

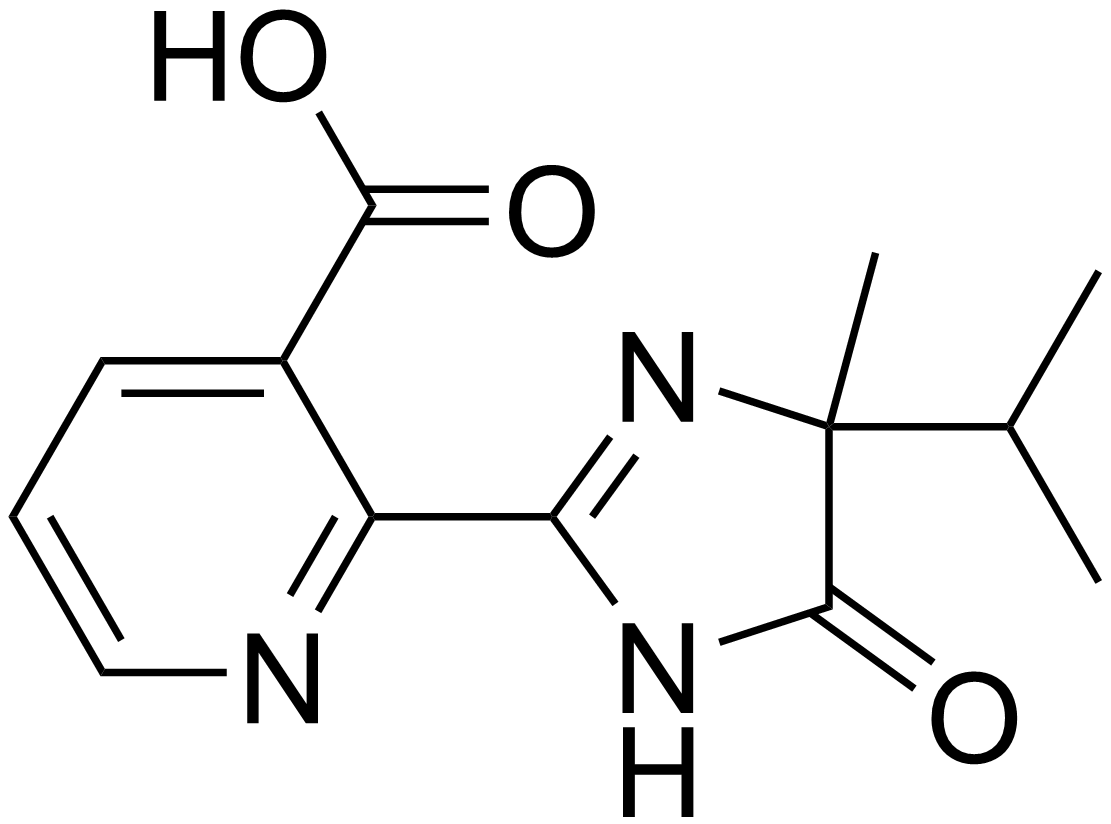

Names
- IUPAC name (RS)-2-(4-Methyl-5-oxo-4-propan-2-yl-1H-imidazol-2-yl)pyridine-3-carboxylic acid

Identifiers
| CAS Number | 81334-34-1 |
| 3D model (JSmol) | Interactive image |
| ChEBI | CHEBI:82021 |
| ChemSpider | 49445 |
| ECHA InfoCard | 100.118.758 |
| KEGG | C18864 |
| PubChem CID | 54738 |
| UNII | 787MX0M5A6 |
| CompTox Dashboard (EPA) | DTXSID8034665 |
- InChI: InChI=1S/C13H15N3O3/c1-7(2)13(3)12(19)15-10(16-13)9-8(11(17)18)5-4-6-14-9/h4-7H,1-3H3,(H,17,18)(H,15,16,19) Key: CLQMBPJKHLGMQK-UHFFFAOYSA-N; InChI=1/C13H15N3O3/c1-7(2)13(3)12(19)15-10(16-13)9-8(11(17)18)5-4-6-14-9/h4-7H,1-3H3,(H,17,18)(H,15,16,19) Key: CLQMBPJKHLGMQK-UHFFFAOYAH
- SMILES: OC(C1=C(C(N2)=NC(C)(C(C)C)C2=O)N=CC=C1)=O

Properties
| Chemical formula | C_{13}H_{15}N_{3}O_{3} |
| Molar mass | 261.281 g·mol^{−1} |
| Density | 1,34 |
| Melting point | 169-171 |
| Solubility in water | 13.47 g/L |
- Except where otherwise noted, data are given for materials in their standard state (at 25 °C [77 °F], 100 kPa). verify (what is ?) Infobox references

Imazapyr is a non-selective herbicide used for the control of a broad range of weeds including terrestrial annual and perennial grasses and broadleaved herbs, woody species, and riparian and emergent aquatic species. It is used in South Africa on dry beans, ground nuts and soya beans.

Imazapyr's HRAC classification is Group B (global, Aus), Group 2 (numeric), as it inhibits acetohydroxyacid synthase.

== Synthesis and Preparation ==
Imazapyr can be prepared by reacting pyridine-2,3-dicarboxylic acid dimethyl ester with 2-amino-2,3-dimethylbutyramid in the presence of potassium tert-butanolate.

Alternatively, it can be prepared by reacting 2-carboxylic acid-3-methylpyridinethyl ester with chlorine, followed by reaction with 2-amino-2,3-dimethylbutyramid in the presence of sodium hydroxide.

== Properties ==
Imazapyr is a colorless solid with a faint odor that is soluble in water. It is stable against hydrolysis at pH values of 5.7 and 9. Imazapyr is chiral, with the (S)-enantiomer being more resistant to degradation than the (R)-isomer, which, in turn, exhibits greater herbicidal activity.

== Uses ==
Imazapyr and its isopropylamine salt are used as herbicides. Imazapyr is used as a pre-emergence herbicide and for post-emergence control of a broad spectrum of weeds, including annual and perennial grasses and dicotyledonous plants. It was first approved in the United States in 1985. In the German Democratic Republic, the compound was approved between 1988 and 1994. Its mode of action involves the inhibition of acetolactate synthase, thereby blocking the synthesis of the amino acids valine, leucine, and isoleucine.

Imazapyr is an ingredient of the commercial product Ortho GroundClear. A related herbicide, imazapic is an ingredient in Roundup Extended Control. Both chemicals are non-selective, long-lasting, and effective in weed control. Water-soluble, depending on soil type and moisture, they can move into parts of the landscape where they were not sprayed. Some desirable landscape plants are especially sensitive to them and can be damaged.

== Approval ==
In 2002, the European Commission decided not to include imazapyr in the list of approved pesticide active ingredients under Annex I of Directive 91/414/EEC.

No pesticides containing this active ingredient are approved in Germany, Austria, or Switzerland.
