= Imazapic =

Names
- IUPAC name 5-Methyl-2-[4-methyl-5-oxo-4-(propan-2-yl)-4,5-dihydro-1H-imidazol-2-yl]pyridine-3-carboxylic acid
- Systematic IUPAC name 5-Methyl-2-[4-methyl-5-oxo-4-(propan-2-yl)-4,5-dihydro-1H-imidazol-2-yl]pyridine-3-carboxylic acid

Identifiers
| CAS Number | 104098-48-8 |
| 3D model (JSmol) | Interactive image |
| ChEBI | CHEBI:147366 |
| ChemSpider | 82867 |
| ECHA InfoCard | 100.111.166 |
| PubChem CID | 91770 |
| UNII | K98N09T10R |
| CompTox Dashboard (EPA) | DTXSID5034270 |
- InChI: InChI=1S/C14H17N3O3/c1-7(2)14(4)13(20)16-11(17-14)10-9(12(18)19)5-8(3)6-15-10/h5-7H,1-4H3,(H,18,19)(H,16,17,20)
- SMILES: O=C(O)c1c(ncc(c1)C)/C2=N/C(C(=O)N2)(C(C)C)C

Properties
| Chemical formula | C_{14}H_{17}N_{3}O_{3} |
| Molar mass | 275.308 g·mol^{−1} |
- Except where otherwise noted, data are given for materials in their standard state (at 25 °C [77 °F], 100 kPa). Infobox references

Imazapic is a chemical used as an herbicide. It controls many broad leaf weeds and controls or suppresses some grasses in pasture, rangeland and certain types of turf. It has a half-life of around 120 days in soil. Imazapic is considered an environmental hazard due to its harmful effects on aquatic life.

Imazapic's HRAC classification is Group B (global, Aus), Group 2 (numeric), as it inhibits acetohydroxyacid synthase.

== See also ==
- Imazapyr
