= Amadori rearrangement =

Chemical reaction

The Amadori rearrangement is an organic reaction describing the acid or base catalyzed isomerization or rearrangement reaction of the N-glycoside of an aldose or the glycosylamine to the corresponding 1-amino-1-deoxy-ketose. The reaction is important in carbohydrate chemistry, specifically the glycation of hemoglobin (as measured by the HbA1c test).

The rearrangement is usually preceded by formation of a α-hydroxyimine by condensation of an amine with an aldose sugar. The rearrangement itself entails intramolecular redox reaction, converting this α-hydroxyimine to an α-ketoamine:

The formation of imines is generally reversible, but subsequent to conversion to the keto-amine, the attached amine is fixed irreversibly. This Amadori product is an intermediate in the production of advanced glycation end-products (AGE)s. The formation of an advanced glycation end-product involves the oxidation of the Amadori product.

== Food chemistry ==
The reaction is associated with the amino-carbonyl reactions (also called glycation reaction, or Maillard reaction) in which the reagents are naturally occurring sugars and amino acids. One study demonstrated the possibility of Amadori rearrangement during interaction between oxidized dextran and gelatine.

== History ==
The Amadori rearrangement was discovered by the organic chemist Mario Amadori (1886–1941), who in 1925 reported this reaction while studying the Maillard reaction.

== See also ==
- Fructoselysine, the Amadori product derived from glucose and lysine
- Glycated hemoglobin, the Amadori product used in the HbA1c diagnostic test for diabetes
