= Advanced glycation end-product =

Proteins or lipids chemically altered by sugar exposure

Advanced glycation end-products (AGEs) are proteins or lipids that become glycated after exposure to sugars. They are formed through a series of non-enzymatic reactions explained in further detail below, and their accumulation is associated with a variety of metabolic diseases such as diabetes, atherosclerosis, chronic kidney disease, age-related macular degeneration (even in non-diabetic animals), and Alzheimer's disease. They are sometimes inaccurately referred to as glycosylation end-products, but that term refers exclusively to the process of enzymatically attaching sugars to other macromolecules through glycosidic linkages, rather than glycation which is stochastic and by definition pathological.

== Formation of AGEs ==
AGE formation is initiated with the Maillard reaction which forms a reversible Schiff base between the carbonyl group of a reducing sugar — or its metabolites such as methylglyoxal — and a free amino group on a protein. This Schiff base undergoes oxidation and rearrangements to form Amadori products, which eventually lead to the formation of AGEs. AGEs affect nearly every type of cell and molecule in the body, are thought to be key contributors to the aging process, and are implicated in the development of some age-related chronic diseases. Notably, AGEs are believed to play a causative role in the vascular complications of diabetes mellitus and age-related macular degeneration (AMD). AGEs formed during in vitro simulated gastrointestinal digestion.

== Dietary sources of AGEs ==
Animal-derived foods that are high in fat and protein are generally rich in AGEs, and are especially prone to further AGE formation during cooking. However, only low molecular weight AGEs are efficiently absorbed through diet. Interestingly, vegetarians have been found to have higher overall concentrations of AGEs compared to non-vegetarians. It is estimated that 10-30% of plasma AGEs come from the diet. This raises uncertainty about the role of dietary AGEs in disease and aging, whether they significantly contribute, or if only endogenously produced AGEs (those formed within the body) are relevant. Most endogenous AGEs are produced intracellularly, and their rates of production and accumulation increase in response to high glycemic index diets, extended exposure to glycating moieties in vitro, and aging in laboratory animals and humans- even in non-diabetics. AGEs also accumulate upon aging, which is explained in more detail below.

== Pathology ==
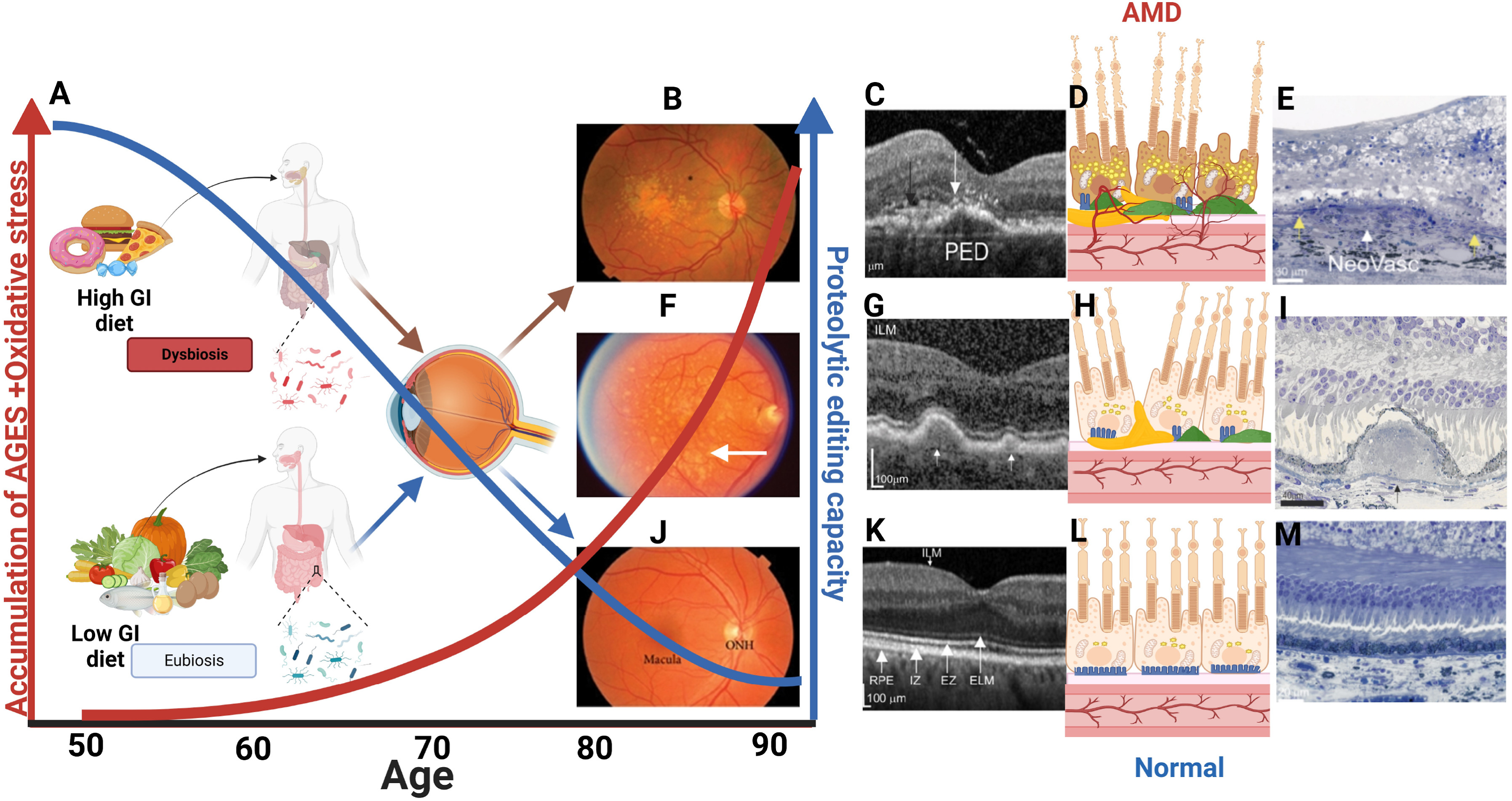
Consuming higher glycemic index diets increases glycation, compromises proteolytic editing, leads to dysbiosis, and is associated with loss of retinal integrity.

Shown to the right is a proposed mechanistic link between dietary sources of glycating moieties and AMD. It is probable that other diseases share similar mechanistic relations to dietary carbohydrate intake.

AGEs also play a role as pro-inflammatory mediators in gestational diabetes and have been implicated in Alzheimer's Disease, cardiovascular disease, and stroke. Additionally, AGE accumulation has been observed in the eye lens and retina of animals fed high glycemic index diets, as well as in HEK-293 and HELA cells exposed to methyglyoxal.

In the context of cardiovascular disease, AGEs can induce crosslinking of collagen, which can cause vascular stiffening and entrapment of low-density lipoprotein particles (LDL) in the artery walls. AGEs can also cause glycation of LDL which can promote its oxidation. Oxidized LDL is one of the major factors in the development of atherosclerosis. AGEs can bind to RAGE receptors and cause oxidative stress as well as activation of inflammatory pathways in vascular endothelial cells.

A receptor nicknamed RAGE, from receptor for advanced glycation end products, is found on many cells, including endothelial cells, smooth muscle, monocytes, macrophages, microglia, neutrophils, and lymphocytes as well as on cells from tissues from the brain, heart, lungs, liver, and kidney. This receptor, when binding AGEs, is under preliminary research to determine if it contributes to age- and diabetes-related chronic inflammatory diseases.

The pathogenesis of this process is hypothesized to involve activation of the nuclear factor kappa B (NF-κB) following AGE binding. NF-κB controls several genes involved in inflammation. AGEs can be detected and quantified using bioanalytical and immunological methods.

== Effects ==
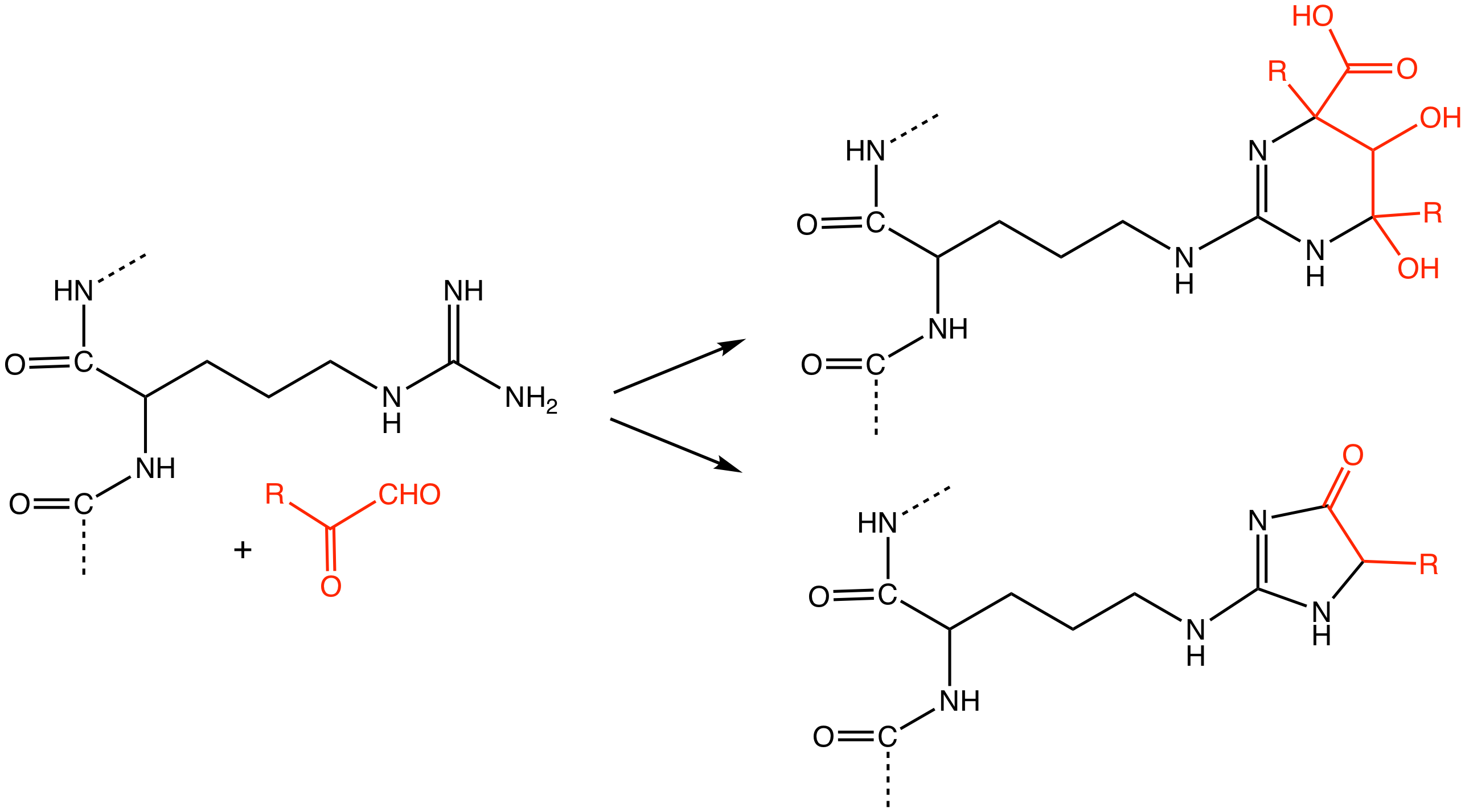
Glycation often entails the modification of the guanidine group of arginine residues with glyoxal (R = H), methylglyoxal (R = Me), and 3-deoxyglucosone, which arise from the metabolism of high-carbohydrate diets. Thus modified, these proteins contribute to complications from diabetes.

AGEs can be produced in the body and in manufactured foods. The accumulation of AGEs may have causative roles in several age-related diseases by forming adducts with proteins and lipids. In preliminary research, AGEs affect nearly every type of cell and molecule in the body, and may be a factor in aging and some age-related chronic diseases. They are also believed to play a causative role in the vascular complications of diabetes mellitus.

AGEs may arise under certain pathological conditions, such as oxidative stress due to hyperglycemia in patients with diabetes. AGEs may have a role as proinflammatory mediators in gestational diabetes.

=== In other diseases ===
AGEs have been implicated in Alzheimer's disease and cardiovascular diseases.

According to in vitro research, the mechanism by which AGEs may induce damage is through a process called cross-linking that causes intracellular damage and apoptosis.

=== Pathology ===
In laboratory studies, AGEs have a range of pathological effects, such as:

- Increased vascular permeability
- Increased arterial stiffness
- Inhibition of vascular dilation by interfering with nitric oxide
- Oxidizing LDL
- Binding cells—including macrophage, endothelial, and mesangial—to induce the secretion of a variety of cytokines
- Enhanced oxidative stress
- Hemoglobin-AGE levels are elevated in diabetic individuals. Therefore, substances that inhibit AGE formation may limit the progression of disease and may offer new tools for therapeutic interventions in the therapy of AGE-mediated disease
- AGEs have specific cellular receptors; the best-characterized are those called RAGE. The activation of cellular RAGE on endothelium, mononuclear phagocytes, and lymphocytes triggers the generation of free radicals and the expression of inflammatory gene mediators. Such increases in oxidative stress lead to the activation of the transcription factor NF-κB and promote the expression of NF-κB regulated genes that have been associated with atherosclerosis.

As of 2024, there is no conclusive clinical evidence for AGEs having a pathological role in aging diseases, and no causality has been demonstrated between processed foods, AGEs, and onset of aging or age-related diseases.

== Clearance ==
In clearance, or the rate at which a substance is removed or cleared from the body, it has been found that the cellular proteolysis of AGEs—the breakdown of proteins—produces AGE peptides and "AGE free adducts" (AGE adducts bound to single amino acids). These latter, after being released into the plasma, can be excreted in the urine.

1. Renal pyramid • 2. Interlobular artery • 3. Renal artery • 4. Renal vein 5. Renal hilum • 6. Renal pelvis • 7. Ureter • 8. Minor calyx • 9. Renal capsule • 10. Inferior renal capsule • 11. Superior renal capsule • 12. Interlobular vein • 13. Nephron • 14. Minor calyx • 15. Major calyx • 16. Renal papilla • 17. Renal column

Nevertheless, the resistance of extracellular matrix proteins to proteolysis renders their advanced glycation end products less conducive to being eliminated. While the AGE free adducts are released directly into the urine, AGE peptides are endocytosed by the epithelial cells of the proximal tubule and then degraded by the endolysosomal system to produce AGE amino acids. It is thought that these acids are then returned to the kidney's inside space, or lumen, for excretion. AGE free adducts are the major form through which AGEs are excreted in urine, with AGE-peptides occurring to a lesser extent but accumulating in the plasma of patients with chronic kidney failure.

Larger, extracellularly derived AGE proteins cannot pass through the basement membrane of the renal corpuscle and must first be degraded into AGE peptides and AGE free adducts. Peripheral macrophage as well as liver sinusoidal endothelial cells and Kupffer cells have been implicated in this process, although the real-life involvement of the liver has been disputed.

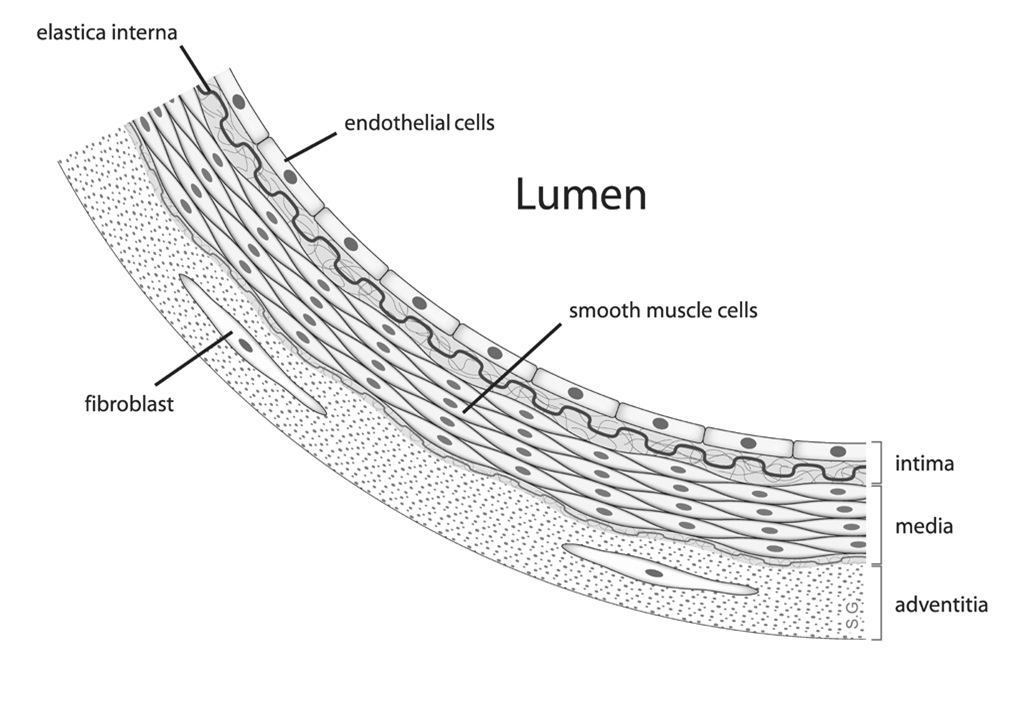
Endothelial cell

Large AGE proteins unable to enter the Bowman's capsule are capable of binding to receptors on endothelial and mesangial cells and to the mesangial matrix. Activation of RAGE induces production of a variety of cytokines, including TNFβ, which mediates an inhibition of metalloproteinase and increases production of mesangial matrix, leading to glomerulosclerosis and decreasing kidney function in patients with unusually high AGE levels.

Peptides and free adducts, the only breakdown products of AGE that are suitable for urinary excretion, are more aggressive than the AGE proteins from which they are derived, and they can perpetuate related pathology in people with diabetes, even after hyperglycemia has been brought under control.

== Research ==
Ongoing studies are performed to specify mechanisms that selectively inhibit the glycation process, and to understand how glycated molecules could be protected from further deterioration, possibly by manipulating the glyoxalase enzyme system to detoxify AGEs.

Development of candidate drugs by the pharmaceutical industry includes compounds whose mechanism of action is to inhibit or revert the glycation process.

== See also ==
- Methylglyoxal
- N(6)-Carboxymethyllysine
- Lipofuscin
