= Hemoglobin A3 =

Hemoglobin A3 is a predominantly historic term for a fraction of normal hemoglobin molecules that is seen when hemoglobin is separated out using starch block electrophoresis. These Hemoglobin molecules are non-enzymatic modifications of the hemoglobin molecules and they encompass hemoglobin_{A1c}, Hb_{1a} (both the subtypes Hb_{1a1} and Hb_{1a2}) and Hb_{1b}.

As these Hemoglobin subtypes are formed over time, they are found more prevalent in older red cells.

== See also ==
- Hemoglobin
