= Protein-ribulosamine 3-kinase =

Identifiers
- EC no.: 2.7.1.172

Databases
- IntEnz: IntEnz view
- BRENDA: BRENDA entry
- ExPASy: NiceZyme view
- KEGG: KEGG entry
- MetaCyc: metabolic pathway
- PRIAM: profile
- PDB structures: RCSB PDB PDBe PDBsum
Search
- PMC: articles
- PubMed: articles
- NCBI: proteins

Protein-ribulosamine 3-kinase (EC 2.7.1.172, FN3KRP, FN3K-related protein, FN3K-RP, ketosamine 3-kinase 2, fructosamine-3-kinase-related protein, ribulosamine/erythrulosamine 3-kinase, ribulosamine 3-kinase) is an enzyme with systematic name ATP:(protein)-N6-D-ribulosyl-L-lysine 3-phosphotransferase. This enzyme catalyses the following chemical reaction

ATP + [protein]-N^{6}-D-ribulosyl-L-lysine $\rightleftharpoons$ ADP + [protein]-N^{6}-(3-O-phospho-D-ribulosyl)-L-lysine

This enzyme takes part in freeing proteins from ribulosamines or psicosamines.
