= D-Fructose-L-histidine =

d-Fructose-l-histidine

Names
- IUPAC name (2S)-3-(1H-Imidazol-5-yl)-2-({[(3S,4S,5R)-2,3,4-trihydroxy-5-(hydroxymethyl)oxolan-2-yl]methyl}amino)propanoate
- Other names N^{α}-(1-Deoxy-d-fructos-1-yl)-l-histidine; Fructose-histidine; FruHis

Identifiers
CAS Number	pyranose: 25020-13-7
3D model (JSmol)	pyranose: Interactive image; Interactive image
ChemSpider	pyranose: 58784186; 57422425
PubChem CID	121230873
- InChI: pyranose: InChI=1S/C12H19N3O7/c16-8-3-22-12(21,10(18)9(8)17)4-14-7(11(19)20)1-6-2-13-5-15-6/h2,5,7-10,14,16-18,21H,1,3-4H2,(H,13,15)(H,19,20)/t7-,8+,9-,10?,12?/m0/s1 Key: DTFFYNMHSHLNDP-NAORZKMKSA-N; InChI=1S/C12H19N3O7/c13-7(1-6-2-14-5-15-6)12(21)22-4-9(18)11(20)10(19)8(17)3-16/h2,5,7-8,10-11,16-17,19-20H,1,3-4,13H2,(H,14,15)/t7-,8+,10+,11+/m0/s1 Key: CJYXLKPEYVVNDY-SCVMZPAESA-N
- SMILES: pyranose: O=C(O)[C@H](Cc1cnc[nH]1)NCC1(O)OC[C@@H](O)[C@H](O)C1O; C1=C(NC=N1)C[C@@H](C(=O)OCC(=O)[C@H]([C@@H]([C@@H](CO)O)O)O)N

Properties
Chemical formula	C_{12}H_{19}N_{3}O_{7}
Molar mass	317.298 g·mol^{−1}
- Except where otherwise noted, data are given for materials in their standard state (at 25 °C [77 °F], 100 kPa). Infobox references

d-Fructose-l-histidine (FruHis) is a ketosamine combining the d-isomer of fructose and the l-isomer of histidine into a functional group. FruHis is present in dried fruits. In interaction with lycopene, FruHis is a potential food related antioxidant and chemopreventive agent, found abundantly in dried tomatoes.

== Research ==
A group of carbohydrate derivatives present in dehydrated tomato products interact with lycopene against prostate cancer. FruHis strongly synergizes with lycopene against the proliferation of highly metastatic rat prostate cancer cell lines in vitro. The FruHis/lycopene combination significantly inhibits in vivo tumorigenesis in syngeneic rats. The ketosamine completely blocks DNA oxidative degradation at >250 μmol/L in vitro, whereas neither ascorbate nor phenolic antioxidants from tomato are effective protectors.

Based on these studies, the American Association for Cancer Research has concluded that FruHis may exert tumor-preventive effect through its antioxidant activity and interaction with lycopene.
