= Fructosamine kinase family =

Fructosamin_kin

Identifiers
- Symbol: Fructosamin_kin
- Pfam: PF03881
- Pfam clan: CL0016
- InterPro: IPR016477
Available protein structures:
- PDB: IPR016477 PF03881 (ECOD; PDBsum)
- AlphaFold: IPR016477; PF03881

In molecular biology the fructosamine kinase family is a family of enzymes. This family includes eukaryotic fructosamine-3-kinase enzymes which may initiate a process leading to the deglycation of fructoselysine and of glycated proteins and in the phosphorylation of 1-deoxy-1-morpholinofructose, fructoselysine, fructoseglycine, fructose and glycated lysozyme. The family also includes ketosamine-3-kinases (KT3K). Ketosamines derive from a non-enzymatic reaction between a sugar and a protein. Ketosamine-3-kinases (KT3K) catalyse the phosphorylation of the ketosamine moiety of glycated proteins. The instability of a phosphorylated ketosamine leads to its degradation, and KT3K is thus thought to be involved in protein repair.

The function of the prokaryotic members of this group has not been established. However, several lines of evidence indicate that they may function as fructosamine-3-kinases (FN3K). First, they are similar to characterised FN3K from mouse and human. Second, the Escherichia coli members are found in close proximity on the genome to fructose-6-phosphate kinase (PfkB). Last, FN3K activity has been found in the blue-green algae Anacystis montana indicating such activity-directly demonstrated in eukaryotes-is nonetheless not confined to eukaryotes.
