= 1,5-Anhydroglucitol =

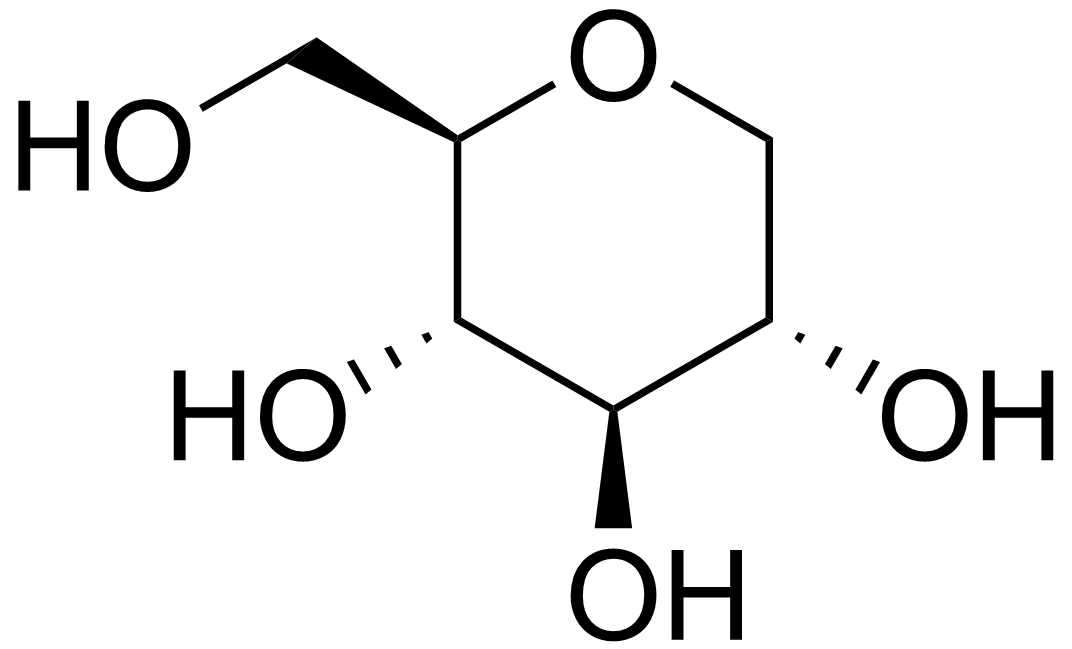

Names
- IUPAC name 1,5-Anhydro-D-glucitol
- Systematic IUPAC name (2R,3S,4R,5S)-2-(Hydroxymethyl)oxane-3,4,5-triol
- Other names: 1-Deoxy-D-glucopyranose; 1,5-AG

Identifiers
CAS Number	154-58-5
3D model (JSmol)	Interactive image
ChemSpider	58485
ECHA InfoCard	100.005.301
EC Number	205-829-3
PubChem CID	64960
UNII	54BB3B7XMZ
CompTox Dashboard (EPA)	DTXSID10893389
- InChI: InChI=1S/C6H12O5/c7-1-4-6(10)5(9)3(8)2-11-4/h3-10H,1-2H2/t3-,4+,5+,6+/m0/s1 Key: MPCAJMNYNOGXPB-SLPGGIOYSA-N
- SMILES: C1[C@@H]([C@H]([C@@H]([C@H](O1)CO)O)O)O

Properties
Chemical formula	C_{6}H_{12}O_{5}
Molar mass	164.157 g·mol^{−1}
- Except where otherwise noted, data are given for materials in their standard state (at 25 °C [77 °F], 100 kPa). Infobox references

1,5-Anhydroglucitol, also known as 1,5-AG, is a naturally occurring monosaccharide found in nearly all foods. Blood concentrations of 1,5-anhydroglucitol decrease during times of hyperglycemia above 180 mg/dL, and return to normal levels after approximately 2 weeks in the absence of hyperglycemia. As a result, it can be used for people with either type-1 or type-2 diabetes mellitus to identify glycemic variability or a history of high blood glucose even if current glycemic measurements such as hemoglobin A1c (HbA1c) and blood glucose monitoring have near normal values. Despite this possible use and its approval by the FDA, 1,5-AG tests are rarely ordered. There is some data suggesting that 1,5-AG values are useful to fill the gap and offer complementary information to HbA1c and fructosamine tests.

== History ==
The role of 1,5-AG was first inferred by Akanuma in 1981 when he demonstrated decreased 1,5-AG levels in diabetic patients. This observation was enhanced in 1983 when it was seen that plasma 1,5-AG fell to undetectable levels in diabetic patients who did not receive insulin. Further studies showed that patients receiving medication to lower blood glucose had lasting improvement in 1,5-AG levels. If medication stopped, 1,5-AG decreased to pre-treatment levels. In 2003, 1,5-AG began to be looked at by researchers in the United States and was shown to be a valuable short-term glycemic monitor. In 2006, 1,5-AG showed its most compelling clinical use when it was demonstrated that an assay (GlycoMark, developed by Nippon Kayaku, Inc.) for postprandial hyperglycemia was able to differentiate two patients who had similar, near goal, hemoglobin A1c values, yet very different glucose profiles as shown by continuous blood glucose monitoring - one of the patients having excessive glycemic variability. In 2014, 1,5-AG in saliva was shown to mirror 1,5-AG in blood, indicating that it could be used as a noninvasive marker of short-term glycemic control.

== Underlying physiology ==
1,5-AG is ingested from nearly all foods during the course of a regular diet and is nearly 100% non-metabolized. It is carried in the blood stream and filtered by the glomerulus, where it enters the kidney. Once in the kidney, 1,5-AG is re-absorbed back into the blood through the renal proximal tubule. A small amount, equal to the amount ingested, of 1,5-AG is released in the urine to maintain a constant amount in the blood and tissue.

Glucose is a competitive inhibitor of the re-absorption. If blood glucose values rise over 180 mg/dL for any period of time, the kidney cannot re-absorb all glucose back into the blood, leading to increased excretion in the urine (glucosuria). As a result, blood levels of 1,5-AG decrease immediately, and continue to decrease until glucose values go below 180 mg/dL. Once the hyperglycemia is corrected, 1,5-AG begins to be re-absorbed from the kidney back into the blood at a steady rate. If a person's glucose levels remain below 180 mg/dL for approximately 4 weeks, 1,5-AG will return to its normal levels. As a result, measurement of the level of 1,5-AG in the blood is a test for a recent history of hyperglycemic episodes.

== GlycoMark diagnostic assay ==
The GlycoMark test is cleared by the FDA to be sold and marketed for the intermediate term monitoring of glycemic control in people with diabetes. It is available through most major reference laboratories, including Quest Diagnostics and Labcorp or may be performed in a hospital or physician's office. A comprehensive evaluation of the assay has been described in the literature.

The assay can be run on almost any open chemistry analyzer, including those found in physician office laboratories. Two reactions take place during the measurement:

Reaction 1 is a pretreatment of the sample performed by adding glucokinase to convert glucose to glucose 6-phosphate in the presence of adenosine triphosphate, pyruvate kinase, and phosphoenol pyruvate. The purpose of this step is to alter glucose, which is found in the blood sample, so that it can not react during reaction 2.

Reaction 2 uses pyranose oxidase to oxidize the second hydroxyl of 1,5-AG, generating hydrogen peroxide. The amount of hydrogen peroxide is detected by colorimetry using peroxidase, and is in direct relationship to the serum 1,5-AG concentration.

=== Interpretation of results ===
Results are in μg/mL. Lower values indicate worsening glucose control, with more frequent and prolonged glucose values over 180 mg/dL. 10 μg/mL of 1,5-AG correlates to an average post meal glucose of 185 mg/dL, and is the target value in people with diabetes. Values over 10 μg/mL indicate glucose on average is below 180 mg/dL. Those with values below 10 μg/mL could benefit from nutritional counseling, and medications which target post meal glucose spikes, such as pramlintide, exenatide, sitagliptin, saxagliptin, repaglinide or rapid acting insulins.

GlycoMark (μg/mL)	Approximate Mean Postmeal Maximum Glucose (mg/dL)
> 12	< 180
10	185
8	190
6	200
4	225
< 2	> 290

== See also ==
- Glycated hemoglobin
- Diabetes
