= 1,5-anhydro-D-fructose reductase =

Class of enzymes

Identifiers
- EC no.: 1.1.1.263
- CAS no.: 206138-19-4

Databases
- BRENDA: enzyme data
- ExPASy: NiceZyme view
- KEGG: enzyme entry
- MetaCyc: metabolic pathway
- Rhea: reactions
- PDB structures: RCSB PDB PDBe PDBsum
- Gene Ontology: AmiGO / QuickGO
Search
- PMC: articles
- PubMed: articles
- NCBI: proteins

In enzymology, 1,5-anhydro-D-fructose reductase (EC 1.1.1.263) is an enzyme that catalyzes the chemical reaction

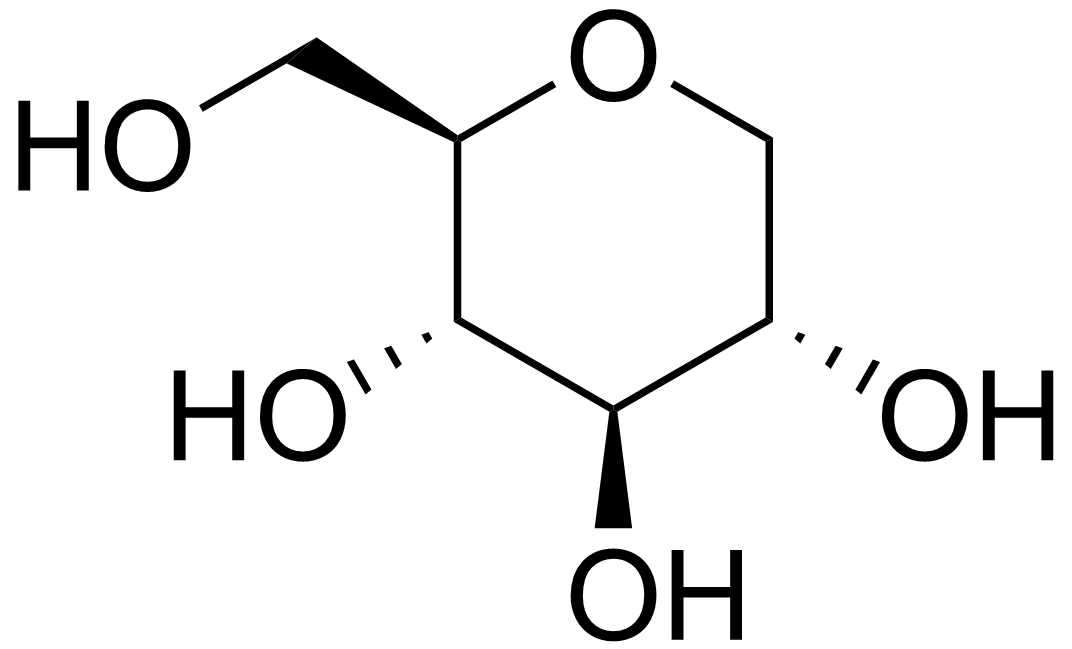
1,5-Anhydroglucitol
+ NADP^{+}
H^{+}
H^{+}
1,5-Anhydro-D-fructose
+ NADPH

The two substrates of this enzyme are 1,5-anhydroglucitol and oxidised nicotinamide adenine dinucleotide phosphate (NADP^{+}). Its products are 1,5-anhydro-D-fructose, reduced NADPH, and a proton.

This enzyme belongs to the family of oxidoreductases, specifically those acting on the CH-OH group of donor with NAD^{+} or NADP^{+} as acceptor. The systematic name of this enzyme class is 1,5-anhydro-D-glucitol:NADP^{+} oxidoreductase.

== Structural studies ==
As of late 2007, only one structure has been solved for this class of enzymes, with the PDB accession code PDB: 2GLX.
