= FN3KRP =

Protein-coding gene in the species Homo sapiens

Identifiers
- Aliases: FN3KRP, FN3KL, fructosamine 3 kinase related protein
- External IDs: OMIM: 611683; MGI: 2679256; GeneCards: FN3KRP
Enzyme activity
| EC # | BRENDA | ExPASy | KEGG | MetaCyc |
|---|---|---|---|---|
| 2.7.1.172 | ↗ | ↗ | ↗ | ↗ |

Gene location (Human)
| Chr. | Chromosome 17 (human) |
| Band | 17q25.3 | Start | 82,716,706 bp |
| Band | 17q25.3 | End | 82,730,328 bp |

Gene location (Mouse)
| Chr. | Chromosome 11 (mouse) |
| Band | 11|11 E2 | Start | 121,312,227 bp |
| Band | 11|11 E2 | End | 121,322,114 bp |
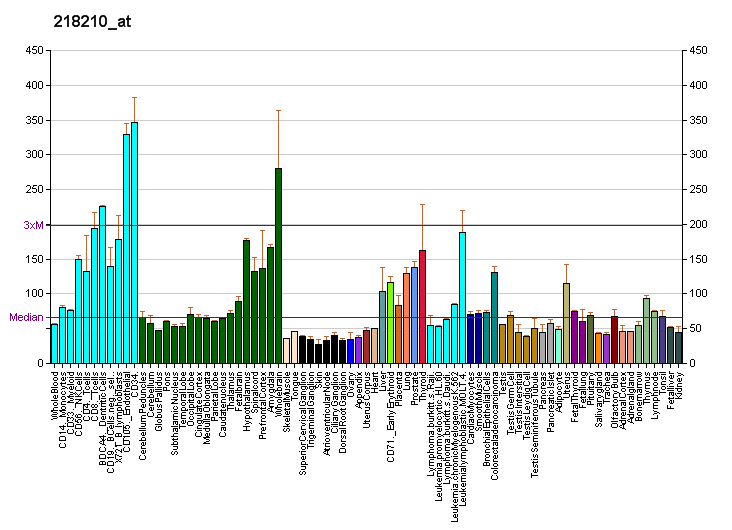
RNA expression pattern
| Bgee | Human / Mouse (ortholog); Top expressed in: C1 segment; left ovary; right ovary; anterior cingulate cortex; amygdala; right frontal lobe; prefrontal cortex; Brodmann area 9; putamen; nucleus accumbens / Top expressed in: lens; bone marrow; dentate gyrus of hippocampal formation granule cell; neural layer of retina; primary visual cortex; cerebellar cortex; hippocampus proper; superior frontal gyrus; human kidney; spermatocyte; More reference expression data |
| BioGPS | More reference expression data |
Gene ontology
| Molecular function | transferase activity; kinase activity |
| Cellular component | cytosol |
| Biological process | post-translational protein modification; phosphorylation |
Sources:Amigo / QuickGO
Orthologs
| Databases | NCBI: entry; OMA: entry |
| Species | Human | Mouse |
| Entrez | 79672 | 238024 |
| Ensembl | ENSG00000141560 | ENSMUSG00000039253 |
| UniProt | Q9HA64 | Q8K274 |
| RefSeq (mRNA) | NM_024619 | NM_181420 |
| RefSeq (protein) | NP_078895 | NP_852085 |
| Location (UCSC) | Chr 17: 82.72 – 82.73 Mb | Chr 11: 121.31 – 121.32 Mb |
| PubMed search |
- Wikidata
| View/Edit Human | View/Edit Mouse |

Ketosamine-3-kinase is an enzyme that in humans is encoded by the FN3KRP (fructosamine-3-kinase-related-protein) gene.
