= Hypothyroidism in dogs =

Hypothyroidism
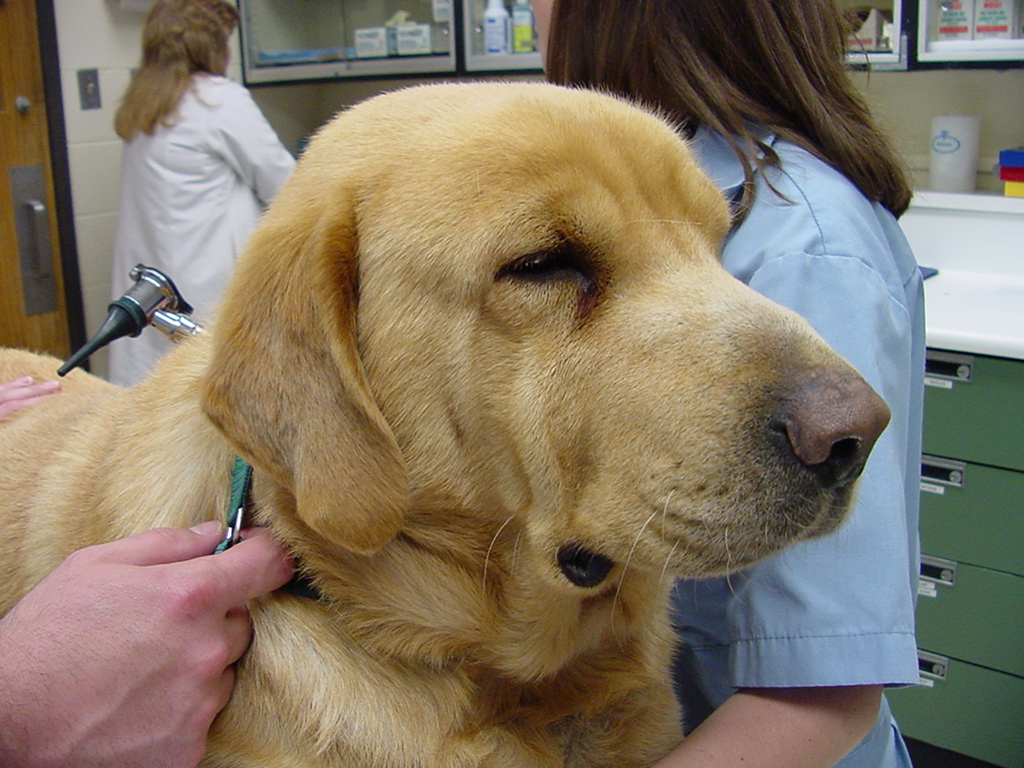
- Labrador Retriever with hypothyroidism
- Specialty: Endocrinology
- Symptoms: Lethargy, endocrine alopecia, Obesity
- Complications: Infections, Bradycardia
- Usual onset: Usually older dogs for most forms, at birth for congenital hypothyroidism
- Duration: Lifelong if not treated
- Types: Congenital, Primary, Secondary, Tertiary
- Causes: Inadequate levels of thyroid-hormone
- Risk factors: Certain breeds
- Diagnostic method: Testing for thyroid hormone levels, Imaging of thyroid
- Differential diagnosis: Hypersomatotropism
- Treatment: Levothyroxine
- Prognosis: Depends on condition and state of thyroid gland; very poor for congenital and myxoedema coma.
- Frequency: 0.23%

Hypothyroidism is an endocrine disorder in which the thyroid gland fails to produce sufficient thyroid hormones. Hypothyroidism is one of the most common endocrinopathies in dogs. It is either acquired or congenital.

== Classification ==
Hypothyroidism is classified as either primary, secondary, or tertiary. Primary hypothyroidism is for when the cause is due to an abnormality of the thyroid gland, secondary hypothyroidism is when the cause is decreased thyroid-stimulating hormone levels, and tertiary hypothyroidism is when the cause is an inadequate amount of thyrotropin-releasing hormone being released.

== Causes ==
The causes of primary hypothyroidism include:

- Lymphocytic thyroiditis
- Idiopathic atrophy
- Neoplasia destroying the thyroid gland
- Iodine deficiency
- Ingestion of goitrogen
- Iatrogenic
- Leishmaniasis
- Congenital hypothyroidism

Lymphocytic thyroiditis and idiopathic atrophy are the most common causes of primary hypothyroidism.

The causes of secondary hypothyroidism include:

- Pituitary malformation
- Pituitary cyst
- Neoplasia destroying the pituitary gland
- Defective thyroid-stimulating hormone molecules
- Defective thyroid-stimulating hormone-follicular cell receptors
- Iatrogenic

The causes of tertiary hypothyroidism include:

- Congenital hypothalamic malformation
- Acquired hypothalamic destruction
- Defective thyrotropin-releasing hormone molecules
- Defective thyrotropin-releasing hormone-thyrotropin receptors

=== Primary hypothyroidism ===
==== Lymphocytic thyroiditis ====
Lymphocytic thyroiditis is caused by an immune-mediated response to the thyroid gland. The exact mechanism is not known, and the understanding of it is poor; however, it is believed that antibodies binding to the follicular cells, colloid, or thyroglobulin antigens activate the process that causes follicular destruction. Breed is an important factor given the increased incidence in certain breeds, such as the Beagle.

==== Neoplastic destruction ====
After a tumour—either one originating in the thyroid gland or invading it—has destroyed 80% or more of the thyroid gland, symptoms of hypothyroidism may occur. Only approximately 10% of thyroid tumours cause hypothyroidism, in part because most thyroid tumours do not affect the whole thyroid gland.

==== Idiopathic atrophy ====
Idiopathic atrophy is the gradual reduction in the size of thyroid follicles and replacement of these follicles with adipose tissue. It may be the end stage of lymphocytic thyroiditis or a primary degenerative disorder.

==== Iodine deficiency ====
Iodine deficiency is a rare cause of hypothyroidism in dogs: commercial dog foods typically contain sufficient levels of iodine for dogs. In recent years, there has been increased interest in homemade diets for pets; however, these diets do not always provide sufficient iodine levels. Working dogs fed all-meat diets have been reported to suffer from hypothyroidism due to iodine deficiency. In addition to iodine deficiency, excessive amounts of iodine can cause thyroid impairment and lead to hypothyroidism.

==== Other causes ====
Goitrogens and anti-thyroid medication are potential causes of primary hypothyroidism, but are rare in practice. Sulfonamides inhibit thyroid peroxidase and can cause hypothyroidism via that mechanism.

Thyroidectomy may cause hypothyroidism: in one study, more than 50% of dogs that underwent a bilateral thyroidectomy required long-term thyroid hormone treatment.

Radioactive iodine used to treat thyroid neoplasia can also result in hypothyroidism.

=== Secondary hypothyroidism ===
Secondary hypothyroidism occurs when pituitary thyrotrophs fail to develop, resulting in impaired thyroid-stimulating hormone secretion. Inadequate levels of thyroid-stimulating hormone decrease thyroid hormone synthesis and secretion, leading to hypoplasia of the thyroid gland.

Secondary hypothyroidism caused by naturally acquired defects of thyrotrophs, like those resulting from a neoplasia, is uncommon. Secondary hypothyroidism caused by thyrotropin suppression from a comorbidity, malnutrition, hormones, or drugs is a prevalent cause of secondary hypothyroidism.

==== Pituitary destruction ====
The destruction of thyrotrophs by a pituitary neoplasia may cause secondary hypothyroidism, although pituitary neoplasias do not commonly cause secondary hypothyroidism.

=== Tertiary hypothyroidism ===
Tertiary hypothyroidism is caused by an inadequate amount of thyrotropin-releasing hormone being secreted by the hypothalamus. Thyrotropin-releasing hormone stimulates the release of thyroid-stimulating hormone; a lack of thyrotropin-releasing hormone leads to decreased thyroid-stimulating hormone, which causes follicular atrophy.

=== Congenital hypothyroidism ===
Congenital hypothyroidism is a rare condition that is often underdiagnosed because dogs with the condition often die as young puppies. Congenital hypothyroidism is caused by a defect in the hypothalamic–pituitary–thyroid axis or the thyroid hormone receptor. It is not uncommon for puppies with the condition to die early due to retarded growth and dwarfism. Signs of congenital hypothyroidism are typically shown within the first 3 months. Congenital secondary hypothyroidism has also been reported in German Shepherd Dogs, where it occurs with pituitary dwarfism associated with a cystic hypophyseal diverticulum (Rathke's pouch); the extent of thyroid-stimulating hormone deficiency in these dogs varies.

== Signs and symptoms ==
Signs of hypothyroidism vary based on factors such as the type and breed. Due to the slow onset and progression of the disease, clinical signs do not initially appear; for example, they do not appear until the 3rd stage of lymphocytic thyroiditis. It is not uncommon for owners to ignore certain signs of hypothyroidism due to the slow progression of metabolic symptoms. Often, metabolic symptoms will go unnoticed until after a dog has received treatment for hypothyroidism.

The most common signs of hypothyroidism are dermatological and changes related to decreased metabolism. In one study, the most common symptoms were dermatological conditions, obesity, and lethargy. Nearly 9/10 dogs had dermatological symptoms, and lethargy and obesity were observed in almost half of all dogs.

A lowered concentration of thyroid hormone affects organs throughout the body.

=== Dermatological ===
The decrease in thyroid hormone levels causes dermatological conditions, specifically alopecia, which is the most common dermatological symptom, as the hair sheds but cannot regrow fast enough due to the anagen stage of hair growth being stunted, as thyroid hormone is important in that stage of hair growth. Other dermatological symptoms include: hyperkeratosis, hyperpigmentation, seborrhoea, pyoderma, otitis externa, and myxoedema. Breed variation in coats can impact the dermatological effect of hypothyroidism. Some dogs develop hypertrichosis, and some develop either a wool-like or a coarse appearance. Immune dysregulation, caused by hypothyroidism, can lead to superficial bacterial infection.

Myxoedema, also known as cutaneous mucinosis, occurs when hyaluronic acid builds up in the dermis. This buildup may cause swelling and thickening of the skin. Myxoedema is a feature of severe cases of hypothyroidism and is sometimes used synonymously. The characteristic facial expression of hypothyroidism is in part caused by myxoedema.

=== Neurological ===
Hypothyroidism can affect the peripheral and central nervous systems. Neurological symptoms vary widely, and it is not currently known what causes them, although multiple theories have been put forward. Some of the other proposed causes of neurological symptoms include: nerve entrapment, due to mucinous deposits; demyelination, due to disruptions to the metabolism of Schwann cells; vascular nerve damage, due to changes to the blood-nerve barrier; and disruption of the axonal cell transport. An immune-related cause has been put forward as well, due to the presence of immune-mediated thyroiditis in some dogs with hypothyroidism.

=== Reproductive ===
There is a belief of an association between hypothyroidism and reproductive symptoms, causing poor reproductive ability. Studies have not identified this association; however, there is no definitive evidence to rule it out. It is recommended that when common causes of poor reproductive ability have been ruled out, hypothyroidism be considered as a possible cause. Hypothyroidism can result in excessive prolactin secretion due to increased thyrotropin-releasing hormone levels. Excessive prolactin secretion causes hyperprolactinaemia and may cause improper lactation in unspayed bitches.

=== Cardiovascular ===
It is uncommon for cardiovascular symptoms to be diagnosed during a clinical exam. The cardiovascular symptoms that are most often diagnosed during examination are bradycardia and a deficit of the apical impulse. The exact mechanism behind the cause of cardiovascular and haemodynamic symptoms is unknown, but may be due to the effects of hypothyroidism on the cardiac muscle. Most cardiac abnormalities in dogs with hypothyroidism are typically mild and thus are not a cause for concern outside of long surgical procedures. Heart failure may occur in cases of primary hypothyroidism; however, heart failure caused by hypothyroidism is rare. Most cases of heart failure are a preexisting condition being exacerbated by thyroid hormone deficiency. Thyroid hormone treatment usually results in resolution of cardiac abnormalities, although this may take several months.

=== Myxoedema coma ===
Myxoedema coma is a very rare but deadly form of severe hypothyroidism characterised by myxoedema, asthaenia, hypothermia, bradycardia, organ dysfunction, hypotension, hypoventilation, and unresponsiveness. It may swiftly progress to stupor and coma. Dogs with the condition have similar test results as those with normal hypothyroidism, but the prognosis is very poor, and most dogs will die from organ failure or an infection occurring alongside the condition. The condition often occurs after a bacterial infection or a bout of hypothermia.

=== Endocrine ===
Due to the effect thyroid hormone has on the pituitary gland, hypothyroidism can cause hypersecretion of growth hormone.

=== Risk factors ===
Hypothyroidism symptoms are usually diagnosed in older dogs; this may be in part due to the slow onset of symptoms.

Breed is a factor in the progression and likelihood of thyroiditis. Golden Retrievers and Doberman Pinschers are often reported as having a predilection for the condition. Breeds with a described mutation in the TPO gene include: Toy Fox Terriers, Rat Terriers, Tenterfield Terriers, and Spanish Water Dogs. Environmental factors have not been well described in the literature.

In a study of more than 140,000 serum samples of suspected hypothyroidism, the five breeds with the highest prevalence of thyroglobulin autoantibodies were: English Setter (31%), Old English Sheepdog (23%), Boxer (19%), Giant Schnauzer (19%), and American Pit Bull Terrier (19%).

No evidence exists of a predilection for any sex, nor whether the animal is neutered or not.

=== Congenital hypothyroidism ===
Congenital hypothyroidism has unique symptoms that distinguish it from other forms of hypothyroidism, such as dwarfism, growth retardation, kyphosis, retarded tooth eruption, shortened lower jaw, and an enlarged skull. The symptoms are due to thyroid hormones' role in bone and mental growth.

=== Thyrotoxicosis ===
Thyrotoxicosis is the presence of an abnormally high circulating thyroid hormone level; in this context, it does not refer to hyperthyroidism but instead to excessive levels due to thyroid hormone treatment. Thyrotoxicosis is a rare side effect in dogs receiving levothyroxine treatment due to the half-life and poor absorption. Thyrotoxicosis occurs when a dog is given too much levothyroxine or has difficulty metabolising it. Symptoms include: polypynoea, anxiety, tachycardia, aggression, polyuria, polydipsia, polyphagia, and cachexia.

=== Comorbidities ===
Immune-mediated endocrine disorders such as diabetes mellitus and hypoadrenocoriticism often occur alongside lymphocytic thyroiditis. One study found 4% of dogs with hypoadrenocorticism also had hypothyroidism, and one dog had hypoadrenocorticism, hypothyroidism, diabetes mellitus, and hyperparathyroidism. Orchitis occurring alongside thyroiditis has been documented in Beagles. The average time to diagnosis of a second endocrinopathy is 4 months, with one dog having a 53-month interval between diagnoses.

A pituitary tumour that causes pituitary destruction may cause hypothyroidism, alongside hypocortisolism, diabetes insipidus, and sexual dysfunction.

== Pathophysiology ==
=== Lymphocytic thyroiditis ===
Lymphocytic thyroiditis is the infiltration of the thyroid gland by lymphocytes, plasma cells, and macrophages. The infiltration progressively causes destruction of follicles and secondary fibrosis. Clinical signs typically do not show before 80% of the thyroid gland has been destroyed. This destruction occurs over a long period, between 1 and 3 years. This destruction is classified into four stages: subclinical thyroiditis, when the infiltration of thyroid follicles occurs, test results will be positive for thyroglobulin and thyroid hormone autoantibodies; antibody positive subclinical hypothyroidism, when the loss of more than 60% of thyroid gland mass has occurred and in response there is an increase of thyroid-stimulating hormone, this stimulates the thyroid gland to maintain thyroxine levels; antibody positive overt hypothyroidism, when a majority of the functional thyroid tissue has been destroyed, test results will show a decrease in serum thyroid hormone concentration and an increase in thyroid-stimulating hormone concentration; and noninflammatory atrophic hypothyroidism, when the thyroid tissue has been replaced by fibrous and adipose tissue and a disappearance of inflammatory cells and circulating antibodies has occurred.

== Diagnosis ==
Given the possible comorbidities and other causes of low serum concentrations of thyroxine, it can be difficult to definitively diagnose hypothyroidism. A strong cause for a diagnosis exists when clinical signs are showing, test results are indicative, and no other illness is present. To exclude the possibility of a thyroid-responsive disease, thyroid supplementation treatment can be ceased once symptoms have disappeared. If symptoms recur after 6–8 weeks, this excludes a thyroid-responsive disease.

=== Lymphocytic thyroiditis ===
Lymphocytic thyroiditis can be diagnosed as the cause of hypothyroidism via histological examination. Histological examination will reveal mononuclear cell infiltration, the absence of follicles containing colloid, and a change in the normal appearance and layout of the cells. Proteinuria may be identified in dogs with lymphocytic thyroiditis, but otherwise, urinalysis results should be normal.

=== Idiopathic atrophy ===
There are no tests for idiopathic atrophy, so it is diagnosed by diagnosis of exclusion. Negative test results for other forms and symptoms that align with the condition are used to diagnose it.

=== Secondary hypothyroidism ===
Secondary hypothyroidism can be histologically diagnosed by examining the thyroid gland's follicles; these follicles will be hypoplastic and lack colloid. Testing will typically reveal decreased or absent levels of thyroid-stimulating hormone; however, this result does not confirm secondary hypothyroidism.

=== Congenital hypothyroidism ===
In dogs with clinical hypothyroidism, the symptoms are more pronounced. A goitre will be present if the hypothalamus-pituitary-thyroid axis is intact. Serum thyroid-stimulating hormone concentration varies based on aetiology.

=== Tertiary hypothyroidism ===
When tertiary hypothyroidism is suspected, it can be confirmed via testing. If thyroid-stimulating hormone levels increase after thyrotropin-releasing hormones have been administered, then a diagnosis of tertiary hypothyroidism has been confirmed. The sensitivity of the thyroid-stimulating hormone assays for dogs makes this a difficult diagnosis.

=== Differential diagnosis ===
Dogs being treated for epilepsy may be incorrectly diagnosed as having hypothyroidism, as anticonvulsant medication used to treat epilepsy can alter the results of tests that measure thyroid hormone levels. Dogs being treated with anticonvulsant medications that lower serum thyroxine levels, such as phenobarbital, do not appear to cause any symptoms of hypothyroidism.

Euthyroid sick syndrome, also known as nonthyroidal illness syndrome, is a term to describe when a euthyroid patient has low levels of serum thyroid hormone due to nonthyroidal illness. Causes can be essentially any systemic illness, as well as trauma and insufficient calorie intake. Dermatological conditions are unlikely to affect thyroid function. Multiple mechanisms and conditions cause this condition. Different conditions do not appear to be more likely to cause more severe changes in serum thyroid hormone concentration; instead, more severe illness causes more severe changes. Common causes of euthyroid sick syndrome include: neoplasia, renal disease, hepatic disease, neurological disease, cardiac failure, inflammatory disease, and diabetic ketoacidosis.

In 40–50% of dogs with Cushing's syndrome, thyroxine and triiodothyronine levels are decreased. Cushing's is a potential differential diagnosis for hypothyroidism when the patient presents with endocrine alopecia. Clinical history can be used to differentiate the two: polyuria, polydipsia, and polyphagia are symptoms of Cushing's but not hypothyroidism. If Cushing's is suspected, a urinalysis of the cortisol/creatinine ratio can be used to diagnosis or exclude Cushing's.

=== Electrocardiography ===
Common electrocardiographic findings in dogs showing symptoms of hypothyroidism include sinus bradycardia and atrioventricular blocks.

=== Echocardiography ===
Common echocardiographic findings in dogs showing symptoms of hypothyroidism include an increased systolic diameter of the left ventricle, a decreased thickness of the left posterior ventricular wall, and prolongation of the pre-ejection period when the heart muscle contracts; and changes to the left ventricular posterior wall, interventricular wall thickness, and diameter of the aorta.

=== Complete blood count ===
A form of anaemia that is normocytic, normochromic, and non-regenerative is diagnosed in approximately 30% of dogs with hypothyroidism.

=== Serum biochemistry ===
The most common finding in a serum biochemistry panel is fasting hypercholesterolaemia, which appears in approximately 75% of dogs with hypothyroidism. Hypertriglyceridaemia is also a common finding. Neither of these is pathognomonic; however, they are supportive evidence of hypothyroidism. Increases in serum lactate dehydrogenase, aspartate aminotransferase, alanine aminotransferase, and alkaline phosphatase activity.

=== Radiography ===
Radiography is not a standard procedure for identifying acquired hypothyroidism. Cervical spine radiographs are only useful when neoplasia is suspected as the cause.

Abnormalities can be detected via radiography in cases of congenital hypothyroidism and these include: retarded epiphyseal ossification; epiphyseal dysgenesis; brachycephalic skull, when untypical for the breed or shorter than expected; shortened vertebral body; reduced length of diaphyses of long bones; retarded ossification; and retarded maturation.

=== Ultrasound ===
An ultrasound is often used when a thyroid neoplasm is suspected. An ultrasound provides a real-time image of the thyroid gland for evaluation. An ultrasound is a useful way to diagnose or exclude euthyroid sick syndrome. In cases of hypothyroidism the thyroid lobes appear round or oval in shape when viewed from the transverse plane, hypoechoic, and a smaller volume and area than clinically healthy patients. A study in 2005 found an ability to diagnose hypothyroidism correctly 96% of the time when euthyroid sick syndrome was also suspected as a possible diagnosis.

=== Blood testing ===
Blood testing can be used to measure baseline serum thyroid hormone concentrations, which are then used to determine whether an animal has thyroid dysfunction. Measuring thyroid dysfunction by stimulating the thyroid with thyroid-stimulating hormone is considered the most accurate method for diagnosing hypothyroidism; however, due to its cost, it is rarely performed. Other methods involve testing for the levels of thyroxine, triiodothyronine, and thyroid-stimulating hormone. Thyroxine makes up most of the thyroid hormone produced by the thyroid gland. Thyroxine is resilient to common forms of degradation and can survive over a week at room temperature. Certain breeds, including the Greyhound, Whippet, Sloughi, Saluki, Basenji, Irish Wolfhound, and some Alaskan sled dogs, have levels of thyroid hormone that differ from the norm.

Thyroid hormone levels can fluctuate for a number of reasons, including another illness, especially euthyroid sick syndrome. Levels of thyroxine and triiodothyronine in blood serum are increased in bitches during dioestrus, possibly due to progesterone improving the binding.

=== Biopsy ===
A biopsy of the thyroid can be used to confirm a diagnosis of primary hypothyroidism in a patient with symptoms and test results that point towards hypothyroidism, especially with severe cases of lymphocytic thyroiditis and thyroid atrophy. A biopsy will not necessarily provide information about the thyroid gland's health and function. When symptoms and test results are less conclusive, a biopsy is more likely to yield an inconclusive result. A large portion of the thyroid needs to be destroyed for thyroid failure to be noted, combined with the factors around surgery itself, makes it a rare procedure for a diagnosis of hypothyroidism.

== Treatment ==
The main form of treatment for all forms of hypothyroidism is levothyroxine sodium. This method allows for normal levels of thyroid hormone in tissue and elsewhere whilst keeping the risk of iatrogenic hyperthyroidism low. The treatment dose for dogs is 10 times that of humans due to a shorter half-life of serum thyroxine and poorer gastrointestinal absorption. Many factors, such as whether treatment is once daily or twice daily, the route of administration, and the animal's physiology, affect treatment, and patients need to be monitored closely whilst undergoing treatment. It is not recommended to change a patient's formulation. Serum concentrations of thyroxine and thyroid-stimulating hormone should be measured every 6–8 weeks, or more frequently if the animal does not respond well to treatment or thyrotoxicosis occurs. Measurements should be taken 4–6 hours after levothyroxine treatment in dogs receiving twice-daily treatment and 4–6 hours before and after in dogs receiving once-daily treatment. In severe cases, such as myxoedema coma, when hypometabolism is occurring, the treatment should be administered intravenously.

Evaluation of treatment should not occur until at least 6–8 weeks have passed. Symptoms of hypothyroidism should resolve if treatment is effective. Lethargy and torpidity are usually resolved within the first month, and obesity by around two months; however, other factors can impact obesity. While symptoms should have resolved within 6–8 weeks, full regrowth of the coat following endocrine alopecia may not occur for several months after starting treatment. Myocardial improvement can occur as early as a month, but in some patients it will not occur until around a year has passed.

=== Liothyronine ===
Liothyronine treatment restores serum triiodothyronine levels to normal, but thyroxine levels remain low. Liothyronine, whilst not the initial choice of therapy, may be used when levothyroxine treatment fails and there is reason to believe the cause of failure is gastrointestinal malabsorption.

Historically, dogs with normal serum thyroxine levels but low serum levels of triiodothyronine would be treated with liothyronine sodium. A defect in the enzymes responsible for converting thyroxine to triiodothyronine was believed to be the cause; however, no evidence of such a defect has been identified. If such a defect were to exist, it would theoretically be present at birth and result in early death or cretinism.

=== Myxoedema coma ===
Myxoedema coma is often fatal, but when identified and treated early, the prognosis is improved. Contrary to typical practice, in which treatment is not initiated until serum thyroid hormone levels are measured, given the severity of the condition, treatment should be started before results are available. Treatment involves treating the underlying hypothyroidism as well as the symptoms such as hypothermia, hypovolaemia, and hypoventilation. Improvement is typically seen within 24 hours, although death is still common.

=== Comorbidities ===
==== Cardiac disorders ====
Thyroid supplementation results in an increased oxygen demand by the myocardium, an increased heart rate, and potentially a reduction in ventricular filling time. Due to this, when a dog is known to have cardiomyopathy, the starting dose should be 25%–50% lower.

==== Hypoadrenocorticism ====
In cases of a patient with hypoadrenocorticism and hypothyroidism, treatment of the hypoadrenocorticism should occur before thyroid supplementation due to the potential for levothyroxine sodium treatment to worsen electrolyte imbalance.

==== Diabetes mellitus ====
Hypothyroidism may cause insulin resistance; treatment for hypothyroidism in a diabetic patient may cause hypoglycaemia, thus diabetic patients need to have their blood glucose monitored.

== Prognosis ==
A dog with treated primary hypothyroidism should have a life expectancy equivalent to that of clinically healthy dogs. Prognosis is worse for myxoedema coma and congenital hypothyroidism. Death is still likely following early treatment for myxoedema coma. Prognosis is poor even for treated dogs with congenital hypothyroidism; many of the effects, like cretinism and retarded growth, result in lifelong complications such as osteoarthritis. The prognosis for secondary hypothyroidism is poor due to the tumour and pituitary gland destruction.

== Epidemiology ==
The most common type is acquired primary hypothyroidism which makes up approximately 95% of hypothyroidism cases in dogs. Secondary hypothyroidism is rare and tertiary hypothyroidism is even rarer.

== Cats ==
The most common thyroid disorder for cats is hyperthyroidism. Hypothyroidism is a rare condition for cats, the most common causes of low serum concentration of thyroxine in cats is an underlying condition (non-thyroidal illness) or iatrogenic. Other causes are caused by birth defect. Adult-onset primary/secondary hypothyroidism is very rare.

=== Iatrogenic ===
The most common cause of hypothyroidism in cats is iatrogenic, with most cases occurring following treatment for hyperthyroidism. Multiple treatments for hyperthyroidism can cause hypothyroidism, including: thyroidectomy, radiotherapy and thionamides.

After 2–3 months most cats with iatrogenic hypothyroidism have regained normal thyroid function; however, some cats will need levothyroxine sodium treatment after this.

=== Adult-onset ===
Adult-onset primary hypothyroidism is very rare; in 2014 only 2 cases have been described in detail: one case involved lymphocytic thyroiditis and in the other case the thyroid gland was not identified during necropsy. A cat that suffered head trauma was reported to have developed secondary hypothyroidism. MRI showed the cat to have a small pituitary gland with the sella turcica being near empty.

Common symptoms are lethargy, anorexia, obesity, and dermatological conditions such as alopecia. In addition the torpidity of the cat will cause a decrease in grooming which may lead to matting and poor coat condition.

=== Congenital ===
The most common non-iatrogenic cause of hypothyroidism; congenital hypothyroidism causes dwarfism in cats. Common causes include a resistance to thyroid-stimulating hormone, thyroid dyshormonogenesis, and thyroid dysmorphogenesis. Other causes have been reported in specific pedigrees or colonies including iodine organification and thyroid peroxidase deficiency.

Prognosis is guarded and the issues relating to retarded growth are typically lifelong.
