= Ketosamine =

A ketosamine is a combination of two organic chemistry functional groups, ketose and amine. An example is the family of fructosamines which are recognized by fructosamine-3-kinase, which may trigger the degradation of advanced glycation end-products (though the true clinical significance of this pathway is unclear). Fructosamine itself, the specific compound 1-amino-1-deoxy-D-fructose (isoglucosamine), was first synthesized by Nobel laureate Hermann Emil Fischer in 1886.
