= Pyranose oxidase =

pyranose oxidase
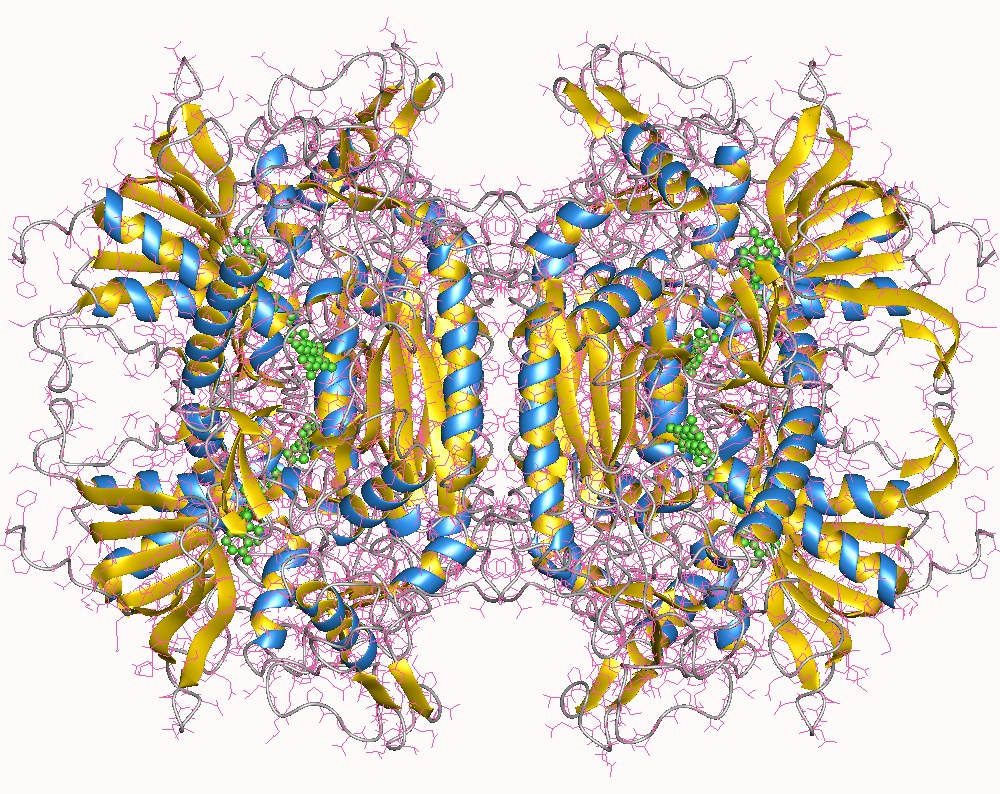
- Pyranose oxidase tetramer, Trametes ochracea

Identifiers
- EC no.: 1.1.3.10
- CAS no.: 37250-80-9

Databases
- BRENDA: enzyme data
- ExPASy: NiceZyme view
- KEGG: enzyme entry
- MetaCyc: metabolic pathway
- Rhea: reactions
- PDB structures: RCSB PDB PDBe PDBsum
- Gene Ontology: AmiGO / QuickGO
Search
- PMC: articles
- PubMed: articles
- NCBI: proteins

In enzymology, a pyranose oxidase (EC 1.1.3.10) is an enzyme that catalyzes the chemical reaction

D-glucose + O_{2} $\rightleftharpoons$ 2-dehydro-D-glucose + H_{2}O_{2}

Thus, the two substrates of this enzyme are D-glucose and O_{2}, whereas its two products are 2-dehydro-D-glucose and H_{2}O_{2}.

Pyranose oxidase is able to oxidize D-xylose, L-sorbose, D-galactose, and D-glucono-1,5-lactone, which have the same ring conformation and configuration at C-2, C-3 and C-4.

This enzyme belongs to the family of oxidoreductases, specifically those acting on the CH-OH group of donor with oxygen as acceptor. The systematic name of this enzyme class is pyranose:oxygen 2-oxidoreductase. Other names in common use include glucose 2-oxidase, and pyranose-2-oxidase. This enzyme participates in pentose phosphate pathway. It employs one cofactor, FAD.

== Structural studies ==
As of late 2007, 8 structures have been solved for this class of enzymes, with PDB accession codes PDB: 1TT0, PDB: 1TZL, PDB: 2F5V, PDB: 2F6C, PDB: 2IGK, PDB: 2IGM, PDB: 2IGN, and PDB: 2IGO.

== Use in biosensors ==
Pyranose oxidase produce higher power output than does glucose oxidase. It is also easier to express in high yields using E. coli.
