= Glycated hemoglobin =

Form of hemoglobin chemically linked to a sugar

- MedlinePlus: 003640
- eMedicine: 2049478
- LOINC: 41995-2

Glycated hemoglobin, also called glycohemoglobin, is any form of hemoglobin (Hb) that is chemically linked to a sugar. (Note: "Glycosylated haemoglobin" is a common misnomer because glycation and glycosylation are different processes, of which only the former is relevant in this case. Glycation is a non-enzymatic process, while glycosylation is enzymatic.) Most monosaccharides, including glucose, galactose, and fructose, spontaneously (that is, non-enzymatically) bond with hemoglobin when they are present in the bloodstream. However, glucose is only 21% as likely to do so as galactose and 13% as likely to do so as fructose, which may explain why glucose is used as the primary metabolic fuel in humans.

The formation of excess sugar-hemoglobin linkages indicates the presence of excessive sugar in the bloodstream and is an indicator of diabetes or other hormone diseases in high concentration (HbA_{1c} > 6.4%). A_{1c} is of particular interest because it is easy to detect. The process by which sugars attach to hemoglobin is called glycation and the reference system is based on HbA_{1c}, defined as beta-N-1-deoxy fructosyl hemoglobin as a component.

There are several ways to measure glycated hemoglobin, of which HbA_{1c} (or simply A_{1c}) is a standard single test. HbA_{1c} is measured primarily to determine the three-month average blood sugar level and is used as a standard diagnostic test for evaluating the risk of complications of diabetes and as an assessment of glycemic control. The test is considered a three-month average because the average lifespan of a red blood cell is three to four months. Normal levels of glucose produce a normal amount of glycated hemoglobin. As the average amount of plasma glucose increases, the fraction of glycated hemoglobin increases predictably. In diabetes, higher amounts of glycated hemoglobin, indicating higher blood glucose levels, have been associated with cardiovascular disease, nephropathy, neuropathy, and retinopathy.

== Terminology ==
Glycated hemoglobin is preferred over glycosylated hemoglobin to reflect the correct (non-enzymatic) process. Early literature often used glycosylated as it was unclear which process was involved until further research was performed. The terms are still sometimes used interchangeably in English-language literature.

== HbA1c ==
Hemoglobin A1c (HbA_{1_{c}}) was originally (1958) the designation of one of the factions formed, when doing cation exchange chromatography. The species forming this faction were only later described in detail. It has since been rendered more precisely to be "a stable minor Hb variant formed in vivo by post-translational modification by glucose", containing primarily glycated N-terminal β-chains.

The naming of HbA_{1c} derives from hemoglobin type A being separated on cation exchange chromatography. The first fraction to separate, considered to be pure hemoglobin A, was designated HbA_{0}, and the following fractions were designated HbA_{1a}, HbA_{1b}, and HbA_{1c}, in their order of elution. Improved separation techniques have subsequently led to the isolation of more subfractions.

=== History ===
Hemoglobin A_{1c} was first separated from other forms of hemoglobin by Huisman and Meyering in 1958 using a chromatographic column. It was first characterized as a glycoprotein by Bookchin and Gallop in 1968. Its increase in diabetes was first described in 1969 by Samuel Rahbar and coworkers. The reactions leading to its formation were characterized by Bunn and coworkers in 1975.

The use of hemoglobin A_{1c} for monitoring the degree of control of glucose metabolism in diabetic patients was proposed in 1976 by Anthony Cerami, Ronald Koenig, and coworkers.

=== Measurement ===
Several techniques are used to measure hemoglobin A_{1c}. Laboratories may use high-performance liquid chromatography, immunoassay, enzymatic assay, capillary electrophoresis, or boronate affinity chromatography. Point of care (e.g., doctor's office) devices use immunoassay boronate affinity chromatography.

In the United States, HbA_{1c} testing laboratories are certified by the National Glycohemoglobin Standardization Program to standardize them against the results of the 1993 Diabetes Control and Complications Trial (DCCT). An additional percentage scale, Mono S has previously been in use by Sweden and KO500 is in use in Japan.

=== Switch to IFCC units ===
The American Diabetes Association, European Association for the Study of Diabetes, and International Diabetes Federation have agreed that, in the future, HbA_{1c} is to be reported in the International Federation of Clinical Chemistry and Laboratory Medicine (IFCC) units. IFCC reporting was introduced in Europe except for the UK in 2003; the UK carried out dual reporting from 1 June 2009 until 1 October 2011.

Conversion between DCCT and IFCC is by the following equation:

$$\mathrm{IFCC\ HBA1c}\, \Big(\frac{\text{mmol}}{\text{mol}}\Big)=[\mathrm{DCCT\ HBA1c}\,(\%) - 2.14] \times 10.929$$

"IFCC" HbA_{1c}	"DCCT" HbA_{1c}	"Mono S" HbA_{1c}
(mmol/mol)	(%)	(%)
10	3.1	2.0
20	4.0	2.9
30	4.9	3.9
40	5.8	4.8
45	6.3	5.3
50	6.7	5.8
55	7.2	6.3
60	7.6	6.8
65	8.1	7.2
70	8.6	7.7
80	9.5	8.7
90	10.4	9.6
100	11.3	10.6

== Damage mechanisms ==
Glycated hemoglobin causes an increase of highly reactive free radicals inside blood cells, altering the properties of their cell membranes. This leads to blood cell aggregation and increased blood viscosity, which results in impaired blood flow.

Another way glycated hemoglobin causes damage is via inflammation, which results in atherosclerotic plaque (atheroma) formation. Free-radical build-up promotes the excitation of Fe^{2+}-hemoglobin through Fe^{3+}-Hb into abnormal ferryl hemoglobin (Fe^{4+}-Hb). Fe^{4+} is unstable and reacts with specific amino acids in hemoglobin to regain its Fe^{3+} oxidation state. Hemoglobin molecules clump together via cross-linking reactions, and these hemoglobin clumps (multimers) promote cell damage and the release of Fe^{4+}-hemoglobin into the matrix of innermost layers (subendothelium) of arteries and veins. This results in increased permeability of interior surface (endothelium) of blood vessels and production of pro-inflammatory monocyte adhesion proteins, which promote macrophage accumulation in blood vessel surfaces, ultimately leading to harmful plaques in these vessels.

Highly glycated Hb-AGEs go through vascular smooth muscle layer and inactivate acetylcholine-induced endothelium-dependent relaxation, possibly through binding to nitric oxide (NO), preventing its normal function. NO is a potent vasodilator and also inhibits the formation of plaque-promoting LDLs (sometimes called "bad cholesterol") oxidized form.

This overall degradation of blood cells also releases heme from them. Loose heme can cause oxidation of endothelial and LDL proteins, which results in plaques.

Glycation pathway via Amadori rearrangement (in HbA_{1c}, R is typically N-terminal valine).

== Principle in medical diagnostics ==
Glycation of proteins is a frequent occurrence, but in the case of hemoglobin, a nonenzymatic condensation reaction occurs between glucose and the N-end of the beta chain. This reaction produces a Schiff base (R−N=CHR', R=beta chain, CHR'=glucose-derived), which is itself converted to 1-deoxyfructose. This second conversion is an example of an Amadori rearrangement.

When blood glucose levels are high, glucose molecules attach to the hemoglobin in red blood cells. The longer hyperglycemia occurs in blood, the more glucose binds to hemoglobin in the red blood cells and the higher the glycated hemoglobin.

Once a hemoglobin molecule is glycated, it remains that way. A buildup of glycated hemoglobin within the red cell, therefore, reflects the average level of glucose to which the cell has been exposed during its life cycle. Measuring glycated hemoglobin assesses the effectiveness of therapy by monitoring long-term serum glucose regulation.

A_{1c} is a weighted average of blood glucose levels during the life of the red blood cells (117 days for men and 106 days in women). Therefore, glucose levels on days nearer to the test contribute substantially more to the level of A_{1c} than the levels on days further from the test.

This is also supported by data from clinical practice showing that HbA_{1c} levels improved significantly after 20 days from the start or intensification of glucose-lowering treatment.

=== Laboratory measurement ===
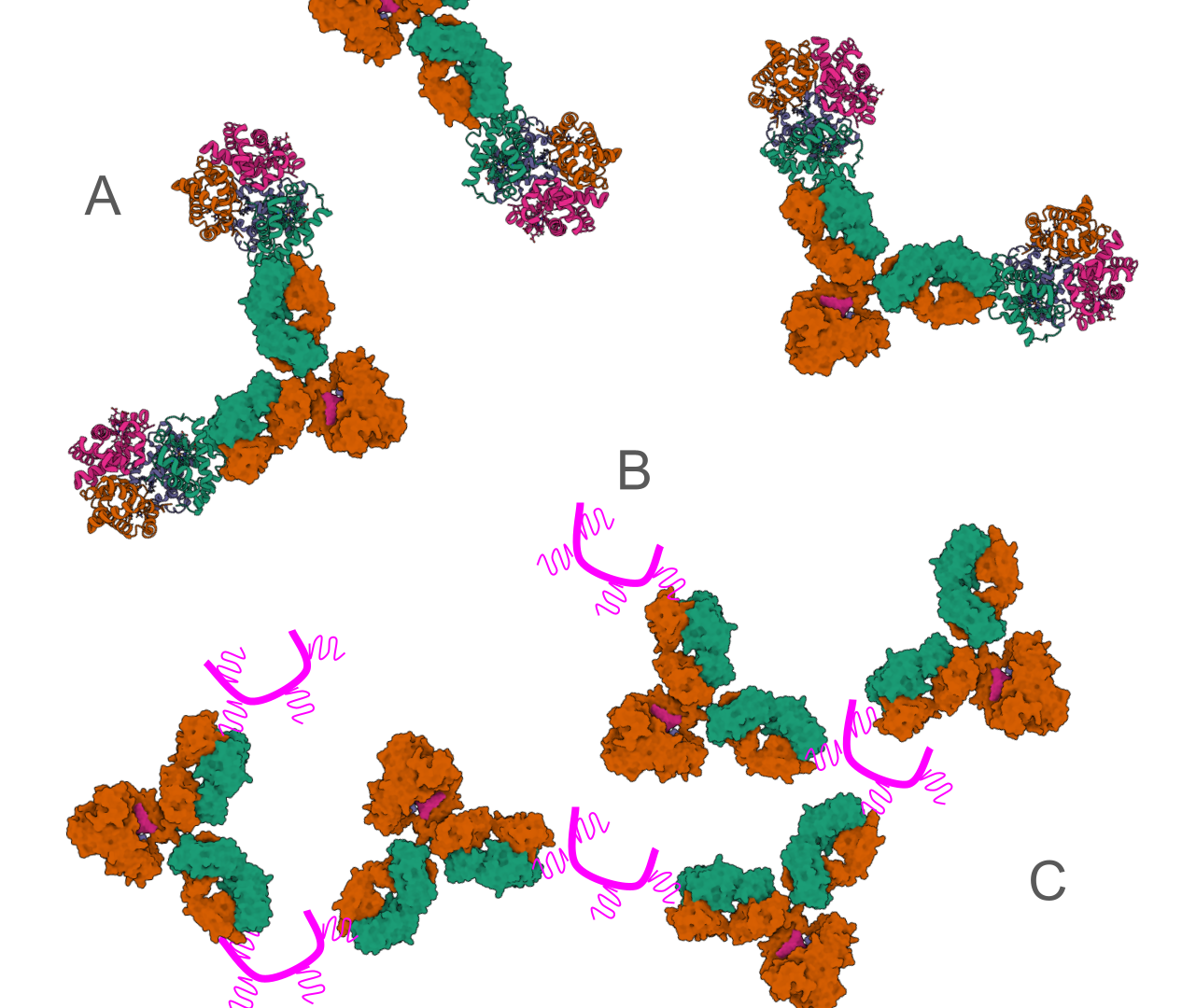
Measuring HbA_{1c} by immunoturbidimetry. A. anti-HbA_{1c} binds HbA_{1c} forming small, non-cross-linked soluble complexes.B. Polyhapten is added (pink), which consists of several HbA_{1c}-like epitopes bound together. C. Excess anti-HbA_{1c} forms large, insoluble, cross-linked complexes with the polyhapten

HbA_{1c} can be measured by multiple methods. Common methods include high-performance liquid chromatography and immunoturbidimetry.

==== Immunoturbidimetry ====
Immunoturbidimetry uses antibodies specific to a substance of interest to cause a measurable change in turbidity (cloudiness) of a solution. An example protocol for HbA_{1c} measurement by immunoturbidimetry is:

- a known amount of anti-HbA_{1c} antibody is added to the sample
- because only one binding site is available per HbA_{1c} molecule (the glycated N-terminal valine on a beta chain), the antibody-HbA_{1c} complex is small and soluble
- excess polyhapten is added to the sample. The polyhapten is several HbA_{1c}-like epitopes bound together
- excess antibody cross-links with the polyhapten and forms large complexes which are insoluble and make the solution turbid
- Turbidity is inversely proportional to HbA_{1c} concentration
- Concentration of HbA_{1c} divided by concentration of total Hb (e.g. measured by absorptiometry) gives a percentage HbA_{1c}

=== Interpretation of results ===
Laboratory results may differ depending on the analytical technique, the age of the subject, and biological variation among individuals. Higher levels of HbA_{1c} are found in people with persistently elevated blood sugar, as in diabetes mellitus. While diabetic patients' treatment goals vary, many include a target range of HbA_{1c} values. A diabetic person with good glucose control has an HbA_{1c} level that is close to or within the reference range.

The International Diabetes Federation and the American College of Endocrinology recommend HbA_{1c} values below 48 mmol/mol (6.5 DCCT %), while the American Diabetes Association recommends HbA_{1c} be below 53 mmol/mol (7.0 DCCT %) for most patients. Results from large trials in 2008–09 suggested that a target below 53 mmol/mol (7.0 DCCT %) for older adults with type 2 diabetes may be excessive: Below 53 mmol/mol, the health benefits of reduced A_{1c} become smaller, and the intensive glycemic control required to reach this level leads to an increased rate of dangerous hypoglycemic episodes.

A retrospective study of 47,970 type 2 diabetes patients, aged 50 years and older, found that patients with an HbA_{1c} more than 48 mmol/mol (6.5 DCCT %) had an increased mortality rate, but a later international study contradicted these findings.

A review of the UKPDS, Action to Control Cardiovascular Risk in Diabetes (ACCORD), Advance and Veterans Affairs Diabetes Trials (VADT) estimated that the risks of the main complications of diabetes (diabetic retinopathy, diabetic nephropathy, diabetic neuropathy, and macrovascular disease) decreased by about 3% for every 1 mmol/mol decrease in HbA_{1c}.

However, a trial by ACCORD designed specifically to determine whether reducing HbA_{1c} below 42 mmol/mol (6.0 DCCT %) using increased amounts of medication would reduce the rate of cardiovascular events found higher mortality with this intensive therapy, so much so that the trial was terminated 17 months early.

Practitioners must consider patients' health, their risk of hypoglycemia, and their specific health risks when setting a target HbA_{1c} level. Because patients are responsible for averting or responding to their own hypoglycemic episodes, their input and the doctors' assessments of the patients' self-care skills are also important.

Persistent elevations in blood sugar (and, therefore, HbA_{1c}) increase the risk of long-term vascular complications of diabetes, such as coronary disease, heart attack, stroke, heart failure, kidney failure, blindness, erectile dysfunction, neuropathy (loss of sensation, especially in the feet), gangrene, and gastroparesis (slowed emptying of the stomach). Poor blood glucose control also increases the risk of short-term complications of surgery, such as poor wound healing.

All-cause mortality is higher above 64 mmol/mol (8.0 DCCT%) HbA_{1c} as well as below 42 mmol/mol (6.0 DCCT %) in diabetic patients, and above 42 mmol/mol (6.0 DCCT %) as well as below 31 mmol/mol (5.0 DCCT %) in non-diabetic persons, indicating the risks of hyperglycemia and hypoglycemia, respectively. Similar risk results are seen for cardiovascular disease.

The 2022 ADA guidelines reaffirmed the recommendation that HbA_{1c} should be maintained below 7.0% for most patients. Higher target values are appropriate for children and adolescents, patients with extensive co-morbid illness and those with a history of severe hypoglycemia. More stringent targets (<6.0%) are preferred for pregnant patients if this can be achieved without significant hypoglycemia.

=== Factors other than glucose that affect A_{1c} ===
Lower-than-expected levels of HbA_{1c} can be seen in people with shortened red blood cell lifespans, such as with glucose-6-phosphate dehydrogenase deficiency, sickle-cell disease, or any other condition causing premature red blood cell death. Other variant hemoglobins, such as HbF or HbE, may have different glycation characteristics or respond differently in a HbA_{1c} test. For these patients, alternate assessment with fructosamine or glycated albumin is recommended; these methods reflect glycemic control over the preceding 2–3 weeks.

In a blood donor, donation will result in loss of mature RBCs and their rapid replacement with newly formed red blood cells. Since these new RBCs will have only existed for a short period of time, their presence will lead HbA_{1c} to underestimate the actual average levels. There may also be distortions resulting from blood donation during the preceding two months, due to an abnormal synchronization of the age of the RBCs, resulting in an older than normal average blood cell life (resulting in an overestimate of actual average blood glucose levels). Conversely, higher-than-expected levels can be seen in people with a longer red blood cell lifespan, such as with iron deficiency.

Results can be unreliable in many circumstances, for example after blood loss, after surgery, blood transfusions, anemia, or high erythrocyte turnover; in the presence of chronic renal or liver disease; after administration of high-dose vitamin C; or erythropoetin treatment. Hypothyroidism can artificially raise the A_{1c}. In general, the reference range (that found in healthy young persons), is about 30–33 mmol/mol (4.9–5.2 DCCT %). The mean HbA_{1c} for diabetics type 1 in Sweden in 2014 was 63 mmol/mol (7.9 DCCT%) and for type 2, 61 mmol/mol (7.7 DCCT%). HbA_{1c} levels show a small, but statistically significant, progressive uptick with age; the clinical importance of this increase is unclear.

A study indicated that it is possible to predict HbA_{1c} values years in advance, by analyzing blood glucose patterns measured using continuous glucose monitors

=== Mapping from A_{1c} to estimated average glucose ===
The approximate mapping between HbA_{1c} values given in DCCT percentage (%) and eAG (estimated average glucose) measurements is given by the following equation:

eAG(mg/dL) = 28.7 × A1c − 46.7
eAG(mmol/L) = 1.59 × A1c − 2.59
(Data in parentheses are 95% confidence intervals>)

HbA_{1c}		eAG	
%	mmol/mol	mmol/L	mg/dL
5	31	5.4 (4.2–6.7)	97 (76–120)
6	42	7.0 (5.5–8.5)	126 (100–152)
7	53	8.6 (6.8–10.3)	154 (123–185)
8	64	10.2 (8.1–12.1)	183 (147–217)
9	75	11.8 (9.4–13.9)	212 (170–249)
10	86	13.4 (10.7–15.7)	240 (193–282)
11	97	14.9 (12.0–17.5)	269 (217–314)
12	108	16.5 (13.3–19.3)	298 (240–347)
13	119	18.1 (15–21)	326 (260–380)
14	130	19.7 (16–23)	355 (290–410)
15	140	21.3 (17–25)	384 (310–440)
16	151	22.9 (19–26)	413 (330–480)
17	162	24.5 (20–28)	441 (460–510)
18	173	26.1 (21–30)	470 (380–540)
19	184	27.7 (23–32)	499 (410–570)

=== Normal, prediabetic, and diabetic ranges ===
The 2010 American Diabetes Association Standards of Medical Care in Diabetes added the HbA_{1c} ≥ 48 mmol/mol (≥6.5 DCCT %) as another criterion for the diagnosis of diabetes.

Diagnostic standard for HbA_{1c} in diabetes
Diagnosis	"IFCC" HbA_{1c}	"DCCT" HbA_{1c}	"Mono S" HbA_{1c}
Normal	< 40 mmol/mol	< 5.7%	< 4.7%
Prediabetes	40–47 mmol/mol	5.7–6.4%	4.7–5.4%
Diabetes	≥ 48 mmol/mol	≥ 6.5%	> 5.5%

== Indications and uses ==
Glycated hemoglobin testing is recommended for both checking the blood sugar control in people who might be prediabetic and monitoring blood sugar control in patients with more elevated levels, termed diabetes mellitus. For a single blood sample, it provides far more revealing information on glycemic behavior than a fasting blood sugar value. However, fasting blood sugar tests are crucial in making treatment decisions. The American Diabetes Association guidelines are similar to others in advising that the glycated hemoglobin test be performed at least twice a year in patients with diabetes who are meeting treatment goals (and who have stable glycemic control) and quarterly in patients with diabetes whose therapy has changed or who are not meeting glycemic goals.

Glycated hemoglobin measurement is not appropriate where a change in diet or treatment has been made within six weeks. Likewise, the test assumes a normal red blood cell aging process and mix of hemoglobin subtypes (predominantly HbA in normal adults). Hence, people with recent blood loss, hemolytic anemia, or genetic differences in the hemoglobin molecule (hemoglobinopathy) such as sickle-cell disease and other conditions, as well as those who have donated blood recently, are not suitable for this test.

Due to glycated hemoglobin's variability, additional measures should be checked in patients at or near recommended goals. People with HbA_{1c} values at 64 mmol/mol or less should be provided additional testing to determine whether the HbA_{1c} values are due to averaging out high blood glucose (hyperglycemia) with low blood glucose (hypoglycemia) or the HbA_{1c} is more reflective of an elevated blood glucose that does not vary much throughout the day. Devices such as continuous blood glucose monitoring allow people with diabetes to determine their blood glucose levels on a continuous basis, testing every few minutes. Continuous use of blood glucose monitors is becoming more common, and the devices are covered by many health insurance plans, including Medicare in the United States. The supplies tend to be expensive, since the sensors must be changed at least every 2 weeks. Another useful test in determining if HbA_{1c} values are due to wide variations of blood glucose throughout the day is 1,5-anhydroglucitol, also known as GlycoMark. GlycoMark reflects only the times that the person experiences hyperglycemia above 180 mg/dL over a two-week period.

Concentrations of hemoglobin A1 (HbA1) are increased, both in diabetic patients and in patients with kidney failure, when measured by ion-exchange chromatography. The thiobarbituric acid method (a chemical method specific for the detection of glycation) shows that patients with kidney failure have values for glycated hemoglobin similar to those observed in normal subjects, suggesting that the high values in these patients are a result of binding of something other than glucose to hemoglobin.

In autoimmune hemolytic anemia, concentrations of HbA1 are undetectable. Administration of prednisolone will allow the HbA1 to be detected. The alternative fructosamine test may be used in these circumstances and it also reflects an average of blood glucose levels over the preceding 2 to 3 weeks.

All the major institutions such as the International Expert Committee Report, drawn from the International Diabetes Federation, the European Association for the Study of Diabetes, and the American Diabetes Association, suggest the HbA_{1c} level of 48 mmol/mol (6.5 DCCT %) as a diagnostic level. The Committee Report further states that, when HbA_{1c} testing cannot be done, the fasting and glucose-tolerance tests should be done. Screening for diabetes during pregnancy continues to require fasting and glucose-tolerance measurements for gestational diabetes at 24 to 28 weeks gestation, although glycated hemoglobin may be used for screening at the first prenatal visit.

== Modification by diet ==
Meta-analysis has shown probiotics to cause a statistically significant reduction in glycated hemoglobin in type-2 diabetics. Trials with multiple strains of probiotics had statistically significant reductions in glycated hemoglobin, whereas trials with single strains did not.

== Standardization and traceability ==
Most clinical studies recommend the use of HbA_{1c} assays that are traceable to the DCCT assay. The National Glycohemoglobin Standardization Program (NGSP) and IFCC have improved assay standardization. For initial diagnosis of diabetes, only HbA_{1c} methods that are NGSP-certified should be used, not point-of-care testing devices. Analytical performance has been a problem with earlier point-of-care devices for HbA_{1c} testing, specifically large standard deviations and negative bias.

== Veterinary medicine ==
HbA_{1c} testing has not been found useful in the monitoring during the treatment of cats and dogs with diabetes, and is not generally used; monitoring of fructosamine levels is favoured instead.

== See also ==
- Diabetes mellitus
- Hemoglobin A2
- Prediabetes
- Proteopedia: Structure of glycated hemoglobin
