= Fructosamine =

Class of organic compounds

Fructosamines are compounds that result from glycation reactions between glucose and a primary amine, followed by isomerization via the Amadori rearrangement. Biologically, fructosamines are recognized by fructosamine-3-kinase, which may trigger the degradation of advanced glycation end-products (though the true clinical significance of this pathway is unclear). Fructosamine can also refer to the specific compound 1-amino-1-deoxy-D-fructose (isoglucosamine), first synthesized by Nobel laureate Hermann Emil Fischer in 1886.

Most commonly, fructosamine refers to a laboratory test for diabetes management that is rarely used in human clinical practice (simple blood glucose monitoring or hemoglobin A1c testing are preferred). In small animal veterinary practice however it is part of the diabetic cat or dog diagnosis and monitoring giving an indication of blood glucose levels over the previous week. Many direct-to-consumer lab testing companies sell fructosamine tests.

== Use in medicine ==
In diabetes, maintaining a normal blood glucose is essential to preventing many medical complications, including heart attacks, diabetic nephropathy, diabetic neuropathy, and diabetic retinopathy eventually leading to blindness. Most commonly, blood sugars are measured by either blood glucose monitoring which measures the current blood glucose level, or by glycated hemoglobin (HbA1c) which measures average glucose levels over approximately 3 months. In a similar way to hemoglobin A1c testing (which measures the glycation of hemoglobin), fructosamine testing determines the fraction of total serum proteins that have undergone glycation (the glycated serum proteins). Since albumin is the most abundant protein in blood, fructosamine levels typically reflect albumin glycation. (Some fructosamine tests specifically quantify the glycation of albumin, or glycated serum albumin instead of all proteins.). Because albumin has a half-life of approximately 20 days, the plasma fructosamine concentration reflects relatively recent (1–2 week) changes in blood glucose.

In patients with diseases that reduce red blood cell lifespan, such as hemolytic anaemia or hemoglobinopathies such as sickle-cell disease, a hemoglobin-based A1c test can be misleadingly low. A1c results may also be falsely high or low in hemoglobinopathies because abnormal hemoglobin variants can interfere in the analysis. In these cases, fructosamine measurement can be used as a marker of blood sugar levels, as its measurements are based on albumin instead of hemoglobin. However, any condition that changes serum albumin (such as the nephrotic syndrome) will affect the fructosamine result.

In practice, fructosamine is rarely measured clinically (even in individuals with hemoglobinopathies or other red cell disorders) due to a number of pragmatic concerns. First, diabetes care is rarely changed in short (1–4 week) intervals, since diabetes medications can take months to reach a steady state. An exception to this is pregnancy, where medication needs can change more rapidly and fructosamine may help provide closer short-term monitoring. Second, fructosamine has higher variability than A1c tests. Third, the overwhelming majority of studies in diabetes care are based on A1c measurements, which can make fructosamine results difficult to interpret. Fourth, the A1c test is very well standardized and trusted due to its nearly universal use. A variety of more advanced forms of the A1c test (e.g. some types of HPLC, immunoassay, and capillary electrophoresis) can more accurately assay A1c levels during complex hemoglobinopathies and other conditions. However this does not overcome the effect of shortened red blood cell lifespan on A1c results.

=== In end-stage renal disease (ESRD) ===
Because glycated albumin (GA) has a shorter half-life than glycated hemoglobin (HbA1c), glycated albumin reflects recent glycemic control more accurately and usefully for monitoring patients with diabetic end-stage renal disease (ESRD) (hemodialysis and peritoneal dialysis patients). It can be used less often than blood sugar testing. An average blood glucose level of 155–160 mg/dL could be matched to a GA value of 18–19% in patients with ESRD. The ratio of GA/HbA1c is 3.0 approximately.

== Interpretation of results ==
There is no standard reference range available for this test. The reference values depend upon the factors of patient age, gender, sample population, and test method. Hence, each laboratory report will include the patient's specific reference range for the test. An increase in fructosamine in lab testing results usually means an increase in glucose in the blood.

On average, each change of 3.3 mmol (60 mg/dL) in average blood sugar levels will give rise to changes of 2% HbA1c and 75 μmol fructosamine values. However, this overemphasizes the upper limit of many laboratories' reference ranges of 285 μmol/L as equivalent to HbA1c 7.5% rather than 6.5%. A comparative study, which has been used in official advice for Quality and Outcomes Framework guidance in the UK and summarized by the United States' National Quality Measures Clearinghouse, gives the following formula and resulting values:

$${\rm HbA1c} = {\rm 0.017} \times {\rm Fructosamine} + {\rm 1.61}$$

Hence:
$${\rm Fructosamine} = ({\rm HbA1c} - 1.61) \times {\rm 58.82}$$

Fructosamine (μmol)	HbA1c %	HbA1c IFCC (mmol/mol)
200	5	31
258	6	42
288	6.5	48
317	7	53
346	7.5	58
375	8	64
435	9	75
494	10	86
552	11	97
611	12	108

== See also ==
- Blood sugar regulation
- Diabetes mellitus
- ECRI Institute
- End Stage Renal Disease Program
- Fructosamine kinase family
- Human serum albumin
