= Fructosamine-3-kinase =

Protein-coding gene in the species Homo sapiens

FN3K

Identifiers
- Aliases: FN3K, fructosamine 3 kinase
- External IDs: OMIM: 608425; MGI: 1926834; GeneCards: FN3K
Enzyme activity
EC #	BRENDA	ExPASy	KEGG	MetaCyc
2.7.1.171	↗	↗	↗	↗
2.7.1.172	↗	↗	↗	↗

Gene location (Human)
Chr.	Chromosome 17 (human)
Band	17q25.3	Start	82,735,615 bp
Band	17q25.3	End	82,751,196 bp

Gene location (Mouse)
Chr.	Chromosome 11 (mouse)
Band	11|11 E2	Start	121,325,739 bp
Band	11|11 E2	End	121,341,317 bp
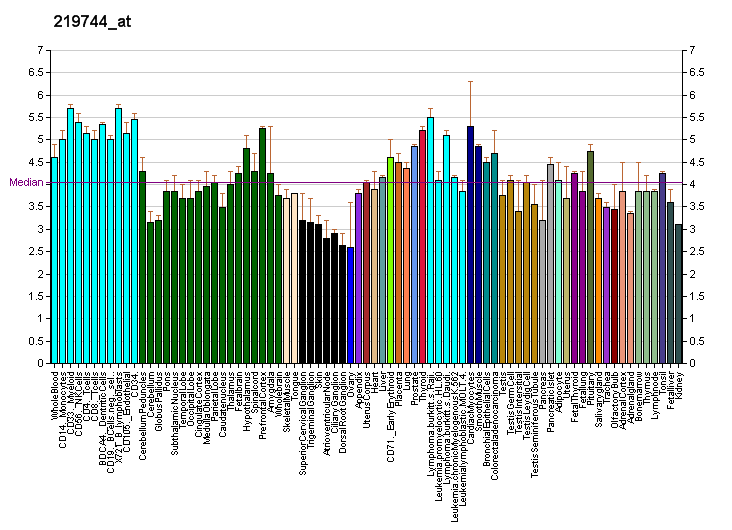
RNA expression pattern
Bgee	Human / Mouse (ortholog); Top expressed in: sural nerve; C1 segment; left adrenal cortex; right adrenal cortex; anterior cingulate cortex; right hemisphere of cerebellum; right frontal lobe; apex of heart; prefrontal cortex; right auricle of heart / Top expressed in: interventricular septum; facial motor nucleus; anterior horn of spinal cord; fetal liver hematopoietic progenitor cell; epithelium of lens; medial vestibular nucleus; inferior colliculi; medial dorsal nucleus; superior frontal gyrus; deep cerebellar nuclei; More reference expression data
BioGPS	More reference expression data
Gene ontology
Molecular function	transferase activity; kinase activity
Cellular component	cytosol; cellular component
Biological process	post-translational protein modification; epithelial cell differentiation; fructoselysine metabolic process; phosphorylation; fructosamine metabolic process
Sources:Amigo / QuickGO
Orthologs
Databases	NCBI: entry; OMA: entry
Species	Human	Mouse
Entrez	64122	63828
Ensembl	ENSG00000167363	ENSMUSG00000025175
UniProt	Q9H479	Q9ER35
RefSeq (mRNA)	NM_022158	NM_001038699; NM_022014
RefSeq (protein)	NP_071441	NP_001033788; NP_071297
Location (UCSC)	Chr 17: 82.74 – 82.75 Mb	Chr 11: 121.33 – 121.34 Mb
PubMed search
- Wikidata
View/Edit Human	View/Edit Mouse

Fructosamine-3-kinase is an enzyme that in humans is encoded by the FN3K gene.

== Function ==
FN3K catalyzes phosphorylation of fructosamines formed by glycation, the nonenzymatic reaction of glucose with primary amines followed by Amadori rearrangement. Phosphorylation of fructosamines may initiate metabolism of the modified amine and result in deglycation of glycated proteins.

FN3K is responsible for the formation of fructose 3-phosphate (F3P), a compound identified in the lenses of diabetic rats. The spontaneous decomposition of F3P leads to the formation of 3-deoxyglucosone (3DG). 3DG contributes to diabetic complications. Treatment of normal and diabetic rats with an inhibitor of FN3K demonstrated a large reduction (~50%) in systemic 3DG in both groups. Removal of 3DG at its source by inhibition of FN3K is a viable option to treat diabetes related diseases since it would require a much smaller dose of drug.

== See also ==
- Protein-fructosamine 3-kinase
